= Warren G. Harding =

President of the United States from 1921 to 1923

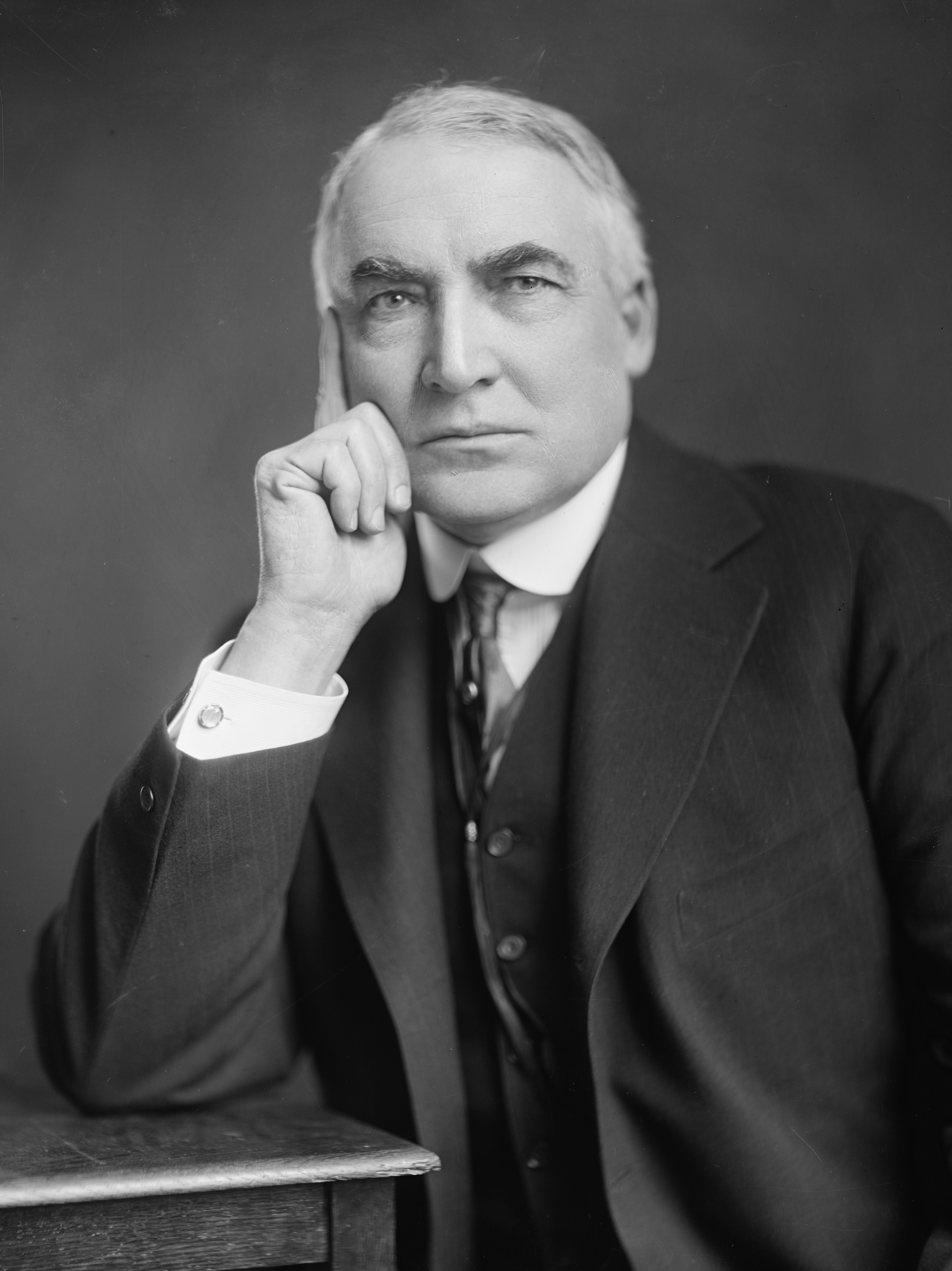
- Portrait, c. 1920–1923

29th President of the United States
- In office March 4, 1921 – August 2, 1923
- Vice President: Calvin Coolidge
- Preceded by: Woodrow Wilson
- Succeeded by: Calvin Coolidge

United States Senator from Ohio
- In office March 4, 1915 – January 13, 1921
- Preceded by: Theodore E. Burton
- Succeeded by: Frank B. Willis

28th Lieutenant Governor of Ohio
- In office January 11, 1904 – January 8, 1906
- Governor: Myron T. Herrick
- Preceded by: Harry L. Gordon
- Succeeded by: Andrew L. Harris

Member of the Ohio Senate from the 13th district
- In office January 1, 1900 – January 4, 1904
- Preceded by: Henry May
- Succeeded by: Samuel H. West

Personal details
- Born: Warren Gamaliel Harding; November 2, 1865 Blooming Grove, Ohio, U.S.
- Died: August 2, 1923 (aged 57) San Francisco, California, U.S.
- Resting place: Harding Tomb
- Party: Republican
- Spouse: Florence Kling (m. 1891)
- Children: Elizabeth (with Nan Britton)
- Parents: George Tryon Harding (father); Phoebe Elizabeth Harding (née Dickerson) (mother)
- Education: Ohio Central College (BA)
- Occupation: Journalist; politician
- Warren G. Harding's voice Harding's "Liberty Under The Law" speech Recorded 1920

Warren Gamaliel Harding (November 2, 1865 – August 2, 1923) was the 29th president of the United States, serving from 1921 until his death in 1923. A member of the Republican Party, he was one of the most popular presidents at the time of his death. After that, a number of scandals were exposed that greatly damaged his reputation.

Harding lived in rural Ohio all his life, except when political service took him elsewhere. As a young man, he bought The Marion Star and built it into a successful newspaper. Harding served in the Ohio State Senate from 1900 to 1904, and was lieutenant governor for two years. He was defeated for governor in 1910, but was elected to the United States Senate in 1914—the state's first direct election for that office. Harding ran for the Republican nomination for president in 1920, but was considered a long shot before the convention. When the leading candidates could not garner a majority, and the convention deadlocked, support for Harding increased, and he was nominated on the tenth ballot. He conducted a front porch campaign, remaining mostly in Marion and allowing people to come to him. He promised a return to normalcy of the pre–World War I period, and defeated Democratic nominee James M. Cox in a landslide, becoming the first sitting senator to be elected president.

Harding appointed a number of respected figures to his cabinet, including Andrew Mellon at Treasury, Herbert Hoover at Commerce, and Charles Evans Hughes at the State Department. A major foreign policy achievement came with the Washington Naval Conference of 1921–1922, in which the world's major naval powers agreed on a naval limitations program that lasted a decade. Harding released political prisoners who had been arrested for their opposition to World War I. In 1923, he died of a heart attack in San Francisco while on a western tour, and was succeeded by Vice President Calvin Coolidge.

The exposure of scandals after Harding's death, including Teapot Dome, as well as an extramarital affair with Nan Britton, eroded his popularity. His interior secretary, Albert B. Fall, and his attorney general, Harry Daugherty, were each later tried for corruption in office; Fall was convicted and Daugherty was not. These trials greatly damaged Harding's posthumous reputation. In historical rankings of U.S. presidents during the decades after his term in office, Harding was often rated among the worst. In the subsequent decades, some historians have begun to reassess Harding's record in office.

== Early life and career ==
=== Childhood and education ===
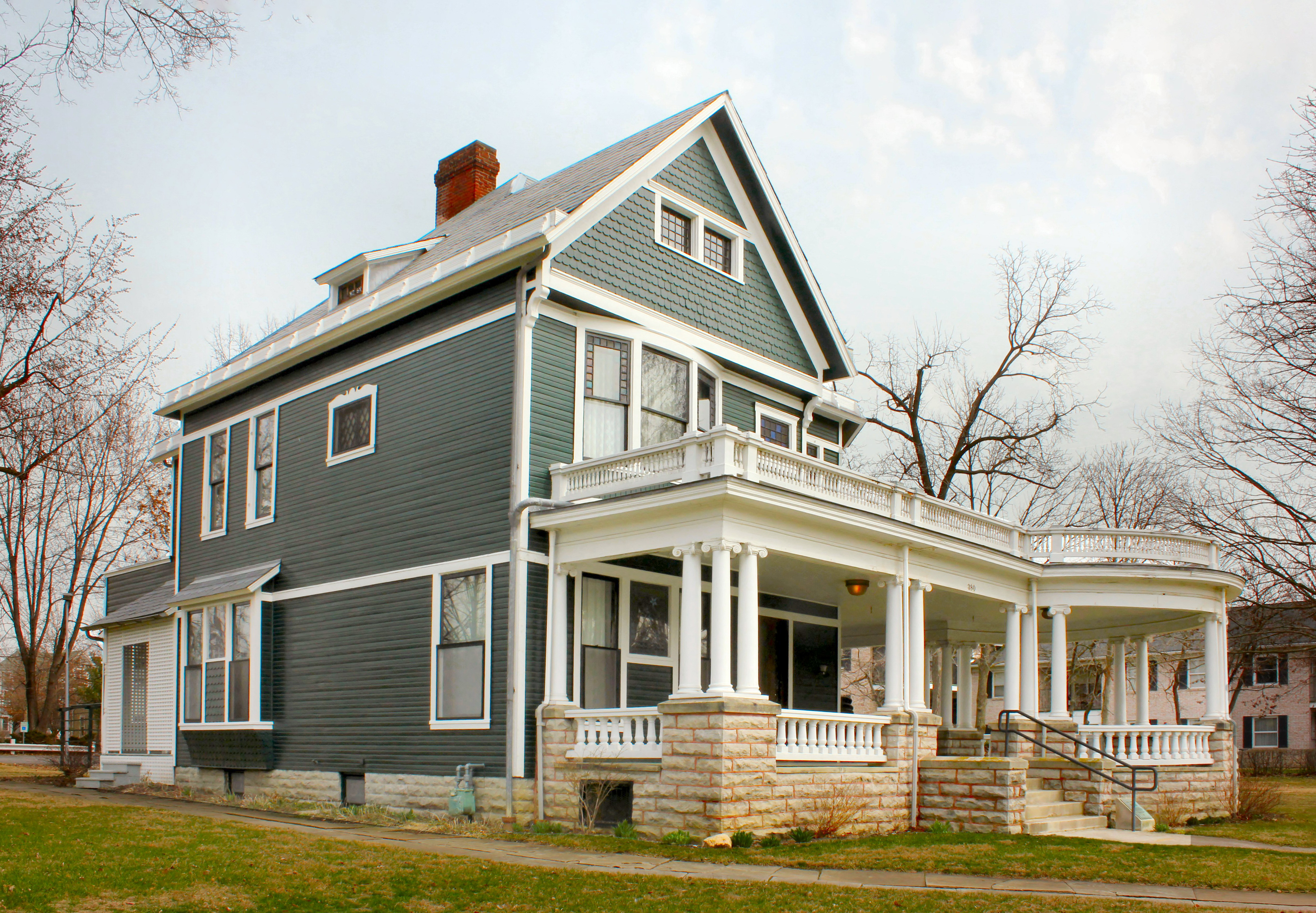
Harding's home in Marion, Ohio

Warren Harding was born on November 2, 1865, in Blooming Grove, Ohio. Nicknamed "Winnie" as a small child, he was the eldest of eight children born to George Tryon Harding (usually known as Tryon) and Phoebe Elizabeth (née Dickerson) Harding. Phoebe was a state-licensed midwife. Tryon farmed and taught school near Mount Gilead. Through apprenticeship, study, and a year of medical school, Tryon became a doctor and started a small practice. Harding's first ancestor in the Americas was Richard Harding, who emigrated from England to Massachusetts Bay around 1624. Harding also had ancestors from Wales and Scotland, and some of his maternal ancestors were Dutch, including the wealthy Van Kirk family.

It was rumored by a political opponent in Blooming Grove that one of Harding's great-grandmothers was African American. His great-great-grandfather Amos Harding claimed that a thief, who had been caught in the act by the family, started the rumor in an attempt at extortion or revenge. In 2015, genetic testing of Harding's descendants determined, with more than a 95% chance of accuracy, that he lacked sub-Saharan African forebears within four generations.

In 1870, the Harding family, who were abolitionists, moved to Caledonia, where Tryon acquired The Argus, a local weekly newspaper. At The Argus, Harding, from the age of 11, learned the basics of the newspaper business. In late 1879, at age 14, he enrolled at his father's alma mater—Ohio Central College in Iberia—where he proved an adept student. He and a friend put out a small newspaper, the Iberia Spectator, during their final year at Ohio Central, intended to appeal to both the college and the town. During his final year, the Harding family moved to Marion, about 6 miles (10 km) from Caledonia, and when he graduated in 1882, he joined them there.

On May 6, 1883, Harding joined the Free Baptist Church in Marion, where he later served as a trustee for 25 years and of which he remained a member until his death. The congregation merged with the Northern Baptist Convention in 1911 and became known as the Trinity Baptist Church in 1912.

=== Editor ===
In Harding's youth, most of the U.S. population still lived on farms and in small towns. Harding spent much of his life in Marion, a small city in rural central Ohio, and became closely associated with it. When he rose to high office, he made clear his love of Marion and its way of life, telling of the many young Marionites who had left and enjoyed success elsewhere, while suggesting that the man, once the "pride of the school", who had remained behind and become a janitor, was "the happiest one of the lot".

Upon graduating, Harding had stints as a teacher and as an insurance man, and made a brief attempt at studying law. He then raised $300 (equivalent to $10,400 in 2025) in partnership with others to purchase a failing newspaper, The Marion Star, the weakest of the growing city's three papers and its only daily. The 18-year-old Harding used the railroad pass that came with the paper to attend the 1884 Republican National Convention, where he hobnobbed with better-known journalists and supported the presidential nominee, former Secretary of State James G. Blaine. Harding returned from Chicago to find that the sheriff had reclaimed the paper. During the election campaign, Harding worked for the Marion Democratic Mirror and was annoyed at having to praise the Democratic presidential nominee, New York Governor Grover Cleveland, who won the election. Afterward, with his father's financial help, Harding gained ownership of the paper.

Through the later years of the 1880s, Harding built the Star. The city of Marion tended to vote Republican (as did Ohio), but Marion County was Democratic. Accordingly, Harding adopted a tempered editorial stance, declaring the daily Star nonpartisan and circulating a weekly edition that was moderately Republican. This policy attracted advertisers and put the town's Republican weekly out of business. According to his biographer, Andrew Sinclair:

The success of Harding with the Star was certainly in the model of Horatio Alger. He started with nothing, and through working, stalling, bluffing, withholding payments, borrowing back wages, boasting, and manipulating, he turned a dying rag into a powerful small-town newspaper. Much of his success had to do with his good looks, affability, enthusiasm, and persistence, but he was also lucky. As Machiavelli once pointed out, cleverness will take a man far, but he cannot do without good fortune.

The population of Marion grew from 4,000 in 1880 to twice that in 1890, and to 12,000 by 1900. This growth helped the Star, and Harding did his best to promote the city, purchasing stock in many local enterprises. A few of these turned out badly, but he was generally successful as an investor, leaving an estate of $850,000 in 1923 (equivalent to $16.06 million in 2025). According to Harding biographer John Dean, Harding's "civic influence was that of an activist who used his editorial page to effectively keep his nose—and a prodding voice—in all the town's public business". To date, Harding is the only U.S. president to have had full-time journalism experience. He became an ardent supporter of Governor Joseph B. Foraker, a Republican.

Harding first came to know Florence Kling, five years older than he, as the daughter of a local banker and developer. Amos Kling was a man accustomed to getting his way, but Harding attacked him relentlessly in the paper. Amos involved Florence in all his affairs, taking her to work from the time she could walk. As hard-headed as her father, Florence came into conflict with him after returning from music college. (Note: Kling was determined that his daughter be able to make a living if it became necessary, and so sent her to the Cincinnati Conservatory of Music. After their estrangement, it became necessary. See Dean, p. 15.) After she eloped with Pete deWolfe, and returned to Marion without deWolfe and with an infant called Marshall, Amos agreed to raise the boy, but would not support Florence, who made a living as a piano teacher. One of her students was Harding's sister Charity. By 1886, Florence Kling had obtained a divorce, and she and Harding were courting, though who was pursuing whom is uncertain.

The budding match snuffed out a truce between the Klings. Amos believed that the Hardings had African American blood, and was also offended by Harding's editorial stances. He started to spread rumors of Harding's supposed black heritage, and encouraged local businessmen to boycott Harding's business interests. When Harding found out what Kling was doing, he warned Kling "that he would beat the tar out of the little man if he didn't cease." (Note: Harding apparently never knew with certainty whether he had any black ancestry. He told a reporter: "One of my ancestors may have jumped the fence.")

The Hardings married on July 8, 1891, at their new home on Mount Vernon Avenue in Marion, which they had designed together in the Queen Anne style. The marriage produced no children. Harding affectionately called his wife "the Duchess" for a character in a serial from The New York Sun who kept a close eye on "the Duke" and their money.

Florence Harding became deeply involved in her husband's career, both at the Star and after he entered politics. Exhibiting her father's determination and business sense, she helped turn the Star into a profitable enterprise through her tight management of the paper's circulation department. She has been credited with helping Harding achieve more than he might have alone; some have suggested that she pushed him all the way to the White House.

=== Start in politics ===
Soon after purchasing the Star, Harding turned his attention to politics, supporting Foraker in his first successful bid for governor in 1885. Foraker was part of the war generation that challenged older Ohio Republicans, such as Senator John Sherman, for control of state politics. Harding, always a party loyalist, supported Foraker in the complex internecine warfare that was Ohio Republican politics. Harding was willing to tolerate Democrats as necessary to a two-party system, but had only contempt for those who bolted the Republican Party to join third-party movements. He was a delegate to the Republican state convention in 1888, at the age of 22, representing Marion County, and would be elected a delegate in most years until becoming president.

Harding's success as an editor took a toll on his health. Five times between 1889 (when he was 23) and 1901, he spent time at the Battle Creek Sanitorium for reasons Sinclair described as "fatigue, overstrain, and nervous illnesses". Dean ties these visits to early occurrences of the heart ailment that would kill Harding in 1923. During one such absence from Marion, in 1894, the Star's business manager quit. Florence Harding took his place. She became her husband's top assistant at the Star on the business side, maintaining her role until the Hardings moved to Washington in 1915. Her competence allowed Harding to travel to make speeches—his use of the free railroad pass increased greatly after his marriage. Florence Harding practiced strict economy and wrote of Harding, "he does well when he listens to me and poorly when he does not."

In 1892, Harding traveled to Washington, where he met Democratic Nebraska Congressman William Jennings Bryan, and listened to the "Boy Orator of the Platte" speak on the floor of the House of Representatives. Harding traveled to Chicago's Columbian Exposition in 1893. Both visits were without Florence. Democrats generally won Marion County's offices; when Harding ran for auditor in 1895, he lost, but did better than expected. The following year, Harding was one of many orators who spoke across Ohio as part of the campaign of the Republican presidential candidate, that state's former governor, William McKinley. According to Dean, "while working for McKinley [Harding] began making a name for himself through Ohio".

== Rising politician (1897–1919) ==
=== State senator ===
Harding wished to try again for elective office. Though a longtime admirer of Foraker (by then a U.S. senator), he had been careful to maintain good relations with the party faction led by the state's other U.S. senator, Mark Hanna, McKinley's political manager and chairman of the Republican National Committee (RNC). Both Foraker and Hanna supported Harding for state Senate in 1899; he gained the Republican nomination and was easily elected to a two-year term.

Harding began his four years as a state senator as a political unknown; he ended them as one of the most popular figures in the Ohio Republican Party. He always appeared calm and displayed humility, characteristics that endeared him to fellow Republicans even as he passed them in his political rise. Legislative leaders consulted him on difficult problems. It was usual at that time for state senators in Ohio to serve only one term, but Harding gained renomination in 1901. After the assassination of McKinley in September (he was succeeded by Vice President Theodore Roosevelt), much of the appetite for politics was temporarily lost in Ohio. In November, Harding won a second term, more than doubling his margin of victory to 3,563 votes.

During this period, Harding became a Freemason. In 1901, he was initiated into Marion Lodge No. 7.

Like most politicians of his time, Harding accepted that patronage and graft would be used to repay political favors. He arranged for his sister Mary (who was legally blind) to be appointed as a teacher at the Ohio School for the Blind, although there were better-qualified candidates. In another trade, he offered publicity in his newspaper in exchange for free railroad passes for himself and his family. According to Sinclair, "it is doubtful that Harding ever thought there was anything dishonest in accepting the perquisites of position or office. Patronage and favors seemed the normal reward for party service in the days of Hanna."

Soon after Harding's initial election as senator, he met Harry M. Daugherty, who would take a major role in his political career. A perennial candidate for office who served two terms in the state House of Representatives in the early 1890s, Daugherty had become a political fixer and lobbyist in the state capital of Columbus. After first meeting and talking with Harding, Daugherty commented, "Gee, what a great-looking President he'd make."

=== Ohio state leader ===
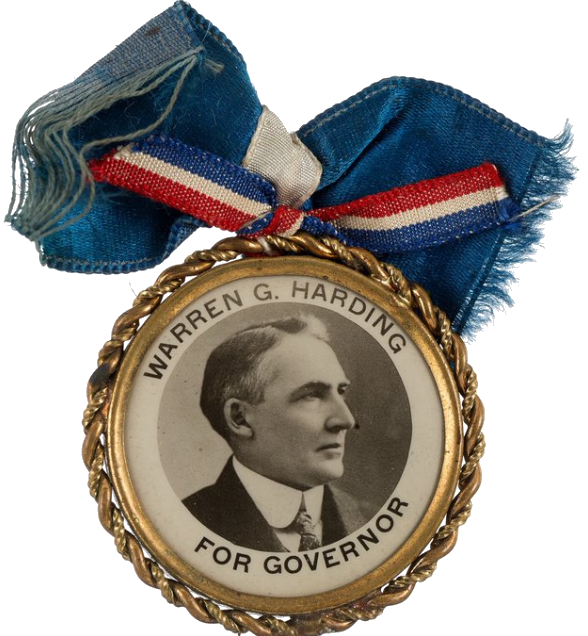
Warren G. Harding for Governor campaign button, 1910

In early 1903, Harding announced he would run for Governor of Ohio, prompted by the withdrawal of the leading candidate, Congressman Charles W. F. Dick. Hanna and George Cox felt that Harding was not electable due to his work with Foraker—as the Progressive Era commenced, the public was starting to take a dimmer view of the trading of political favors and of bosses such as Cox. Accordingly, they persuaded Cleveland banker Myron T. Herrick, a friend of McKinley's, to run. Herrick was also better-placed to take votes away from the likely Democratic candidate, reforming Cleveland Mayor Tom L. Johnson. With little chance at the gubernatorial nomination, Harding sought nomination as lieutenant governor, and both Herrick and Harding were nominated by acclamation. Foraker and Hanna (who died of typhoid fever in February 1904) both campaigned for what was dubbed the Four-H ticket. Herrick and Harding won by overwhelming margins.

Once he and Harding were inaugurated, Herrick made ill-advised decisions that turned crucial Republican constituencies against him, alienating farmers by opposing the establishment of an agricultural college. On the other hand, according to Sinclair, "Harding had little to do, and he did it very well". His responsibility to preside over the state Senate allowed him to increase his growing network of political contacts. Harding and others envisioned a successful gubernatorial run in 1905, but Herrick refused to stand aside. In early 1905, Harding announced he would accept nomination as governor if offered, but faced with the anger of leaders such as Cox, Foraker and Dick (Hanna's replacement in the Senate), announced he would seek no office in 1905. Herrick was defeated, but his new running mate, Andrew L. Harris, was elected, and succeeded as governor after five months in office on the death of Democrat John M. Pattison. One Republican official wrote to Harding, "Aren't you sorry Dick wouldn't let you run for Lieutenant Governor?"

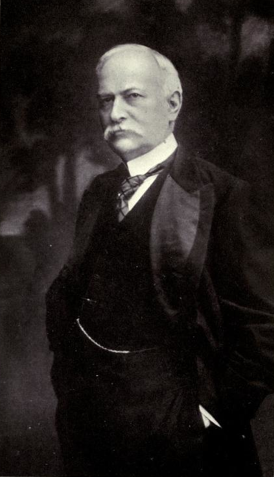
Senator Joseph B. Foraker in 1908, his final full year as senator before his re-election defeat

In addition to helping pick a president, Ohio voters in 1908 were to choose the legislators who would decide whether to re-elect Foraker. The senator had quarreled with President Roosevelt over the Brownsville Affair. Though Foraker had little chance of winning, he sought the Republican presidential nomination against his fellow Cincinnatian, Secretary of War William Howard Taft, who was Roosevelt's chosen successor. On January 6, 1908, Harding's Star endorsed Foraker and upbraided Roosevelt for trying to destroy the senator's career over a matter of conscience. On January 22, Harding in the Star reversed course and declared for Taft, deeming Foraker defeated. According to Sinclair, Harding's change to Taft "was not ... because he saw the light but because he felt the heat". Jumping on the Taft bandwagon allowed Harding to survive his patron's disaster—Foraker failed to gain the presidential nomination, and was defeated for a third term as senator. Also helpful in saving Harding's career was that he was popular with, and had done favors for, the more progressive forces that now controlled the Ohio Republican Party.

Harding sought and gained the 1910 Republican gubernatorial nomination. At that time, the party was deeply divided between progressive and conservative wings, and could not defeat the united Democrats; he lost the election to incumbent Judson Harmon. Harry Daugherty managed Harding's campaign, but the defeated candidate did not hold the loss against him. Despite the growing rift between them, both President Taft and former president Roosevelt came to Ohio to campaign for Harding, but their quarrels split the Republican Party and helped assure Harding's defeat.

The party split grew, and in 1912, Taft and Roosevelt were rivals for the Republican nomination. The 1912 Republican National Convention was bitterly divided. At Taft's request, Harding gave a speech nominating the president, but the angry delegates were not receptive to Harding's oratory. Taft was renominated, but Roosevelt supporters bolted the party. Harding, as a loyal Republican, supported Taft. The Republican vote was split between Taft, the party's official candidate, and Roosevelt, running under the label of the Progressive Party. This allowed the Democratic candidate, New Jersey Governor Woodrow Wilson, to be elected.

=== U.S. Senator ===
==== Election of 1914 ====
Congressman Theodore Burton had been elected as senator by the state legislature in Foraker's place in 1909, and announced that he would seek a second term in the 1914 elections. By this time, the Seventeenth Amendment to the United States Constitution had been ratified, giving the people the right to elect senators, and Ohio had instituted primary elections for the office. Foraker and former congressman Ralph D. Cole also entered the Republican primary. When Burton withdrew, Foraker became the favorite, but his Old Guard Republicanism was deemed outdated, and Harding was urged to enter the race. Daugherty claimed credit for persuading Harding to run: "I found him like a turtle sunning himself on a log, and I pushed him into the water." According to Harding biographer Randolph Downes, "he put on a campaign of such sweetness and light as would have won the plaudits of the angels. It was calculated to offend nobody except Democrats." Although Harding did not attack Foraker, his supporters had no such scruples. Harding won the primary by 12,000 votes over Foraker.

Read The Menace and get the dope,
Go to the polls and beat the Pope.

— Slogan written on Ohio walls and fences, 1914

Harding's general election opponent was Ohio Attorney General Timothy Hogan, who had risen to statewide office despite widespread prejudice against Roman Catholics in rural areas. In 1914, the start of World War I and the prospect of a Catholic senator from Ohio increased nativist sentiment. Propaganda sheets with names like The Menace and The Defender contained warnings that Hogan was the vanguard in a plot led by Pope Benedict XV through the Knights of Columbus to control Ohio. Harding did not attack Hogan (an old friend) on this or most other issues, but he did not denounce the nativist hatred for his opponent.

Harding's conciliatory campaigning style aided him; one Harding friend deemed the candidate's stump speech during the 1914 fall campaign as "a rambling, high-sounding mixture of platitudes, patriotism, and pure nonsense". Dean notes, "Harding used his oratory to good effect; it got him elected, making as few enemies as possible in the process." Harding won by over 100,000 votes in a landslide that also swept into office a Republican governor, Frank B. Willis.

==== Junior senator ====
When Harding joined the U.S. Senate, the Democrats controlled both houses of Congress, and were led by President Wilson. As a junior senator in the minority, Harding received unimportant committee assignments, but carried out those duties assiduously. He was a safe, conservative, Republican vote. As during his time in the Ohio Senate, Harding came to be widely liked.

On two issues, women's suffrage, and the prohibition of alcohol, where picking the wrong side would have damaged his presidential prospects in 1920, he prospered by taking nuanced positions. As senator-elect, he indicated that he could not support votes for women until Ohio did. Increased support for suffrage there and among Senate Republicans meant that by the time Congress voted on the issue, Harding was a firm supporter. Harding, who drank, initially voted against banning alcohol. He voted for the Eighteenth Amendment, which imposed prohibition, after successfully moving to modify it by placing a time limit on ratification, which was expected to kill it. Once it was ratified anyway, Harding voted to override Wilson's veto of the Volstead Bill, which implemented the amendment, assuring the support of the Anti-Saloon League.

Harding, as a politician respected by both Republicans and Progressives, was asked to be temporary chairman of the 1916 Republican National Convention and to deliver the keynote address. He urged delegates to stand as a united party. The convention nominated Justice Charles Evans Hughes. Harding reached out to Roosevelt once the former president declined the 1916 Progressive nomination, a refusal that effectively scuttled that party. In the November 1916 presidential election, despite increasing Republican unity, Hughes was narrowly defeated by Wilson.

Harding spoke and voted in favor of the resolution of war requested by Wilson in April 1917 that plunged the United States into World War I. In August, Harding argued for giving Wilson almost dictatorial powers, stating that democracy had little place in time of war. Harding voted for most war legislation, including the Espionage Act of 1917, which restricted civil liberties, though he opposed the excess profits tax as anti-business. In May 1918, Harding, less enthusiastic about Wilson, opposed a bill to expand the president's powers.

In the 1918 midterm congressional elections, held just before the armistice, Republicans narrowly took control of the Senate. Harding was appointed to the Senate Foreign Relations Committee. Wilson took no senators with him to the Paris Peace Conference, confident that he could force what became the Treaty of Versailles through the Senate by appealing to the people. When he returned with a single treaty establishing both peace and a League of Nations, the country was overwhelmingly on his side. Many senators disliked Article X of the League Covenant, that committed signatories to the defense of any member nation that was attacked, seeing it as forcing the United States to war without the assent of Congress. Harding was one of 39 senators who signed a round-robin letter opposing the League. When Wilson invited the Foreign Relations Committee to the White House to informally discuss the treaty, Harding ably questioned Wilson about Article X; the president evaded his inquiries. The Senate debated Versailles in September 1919, and Harding made a major speech against it. By then, Wilson had suffered a stroke while on a speaking tour. With an incapacitated president in the White House and less support in the country, the treaty was defeated.

== Presidential election of 1920 ==
=== Primary campaign ===
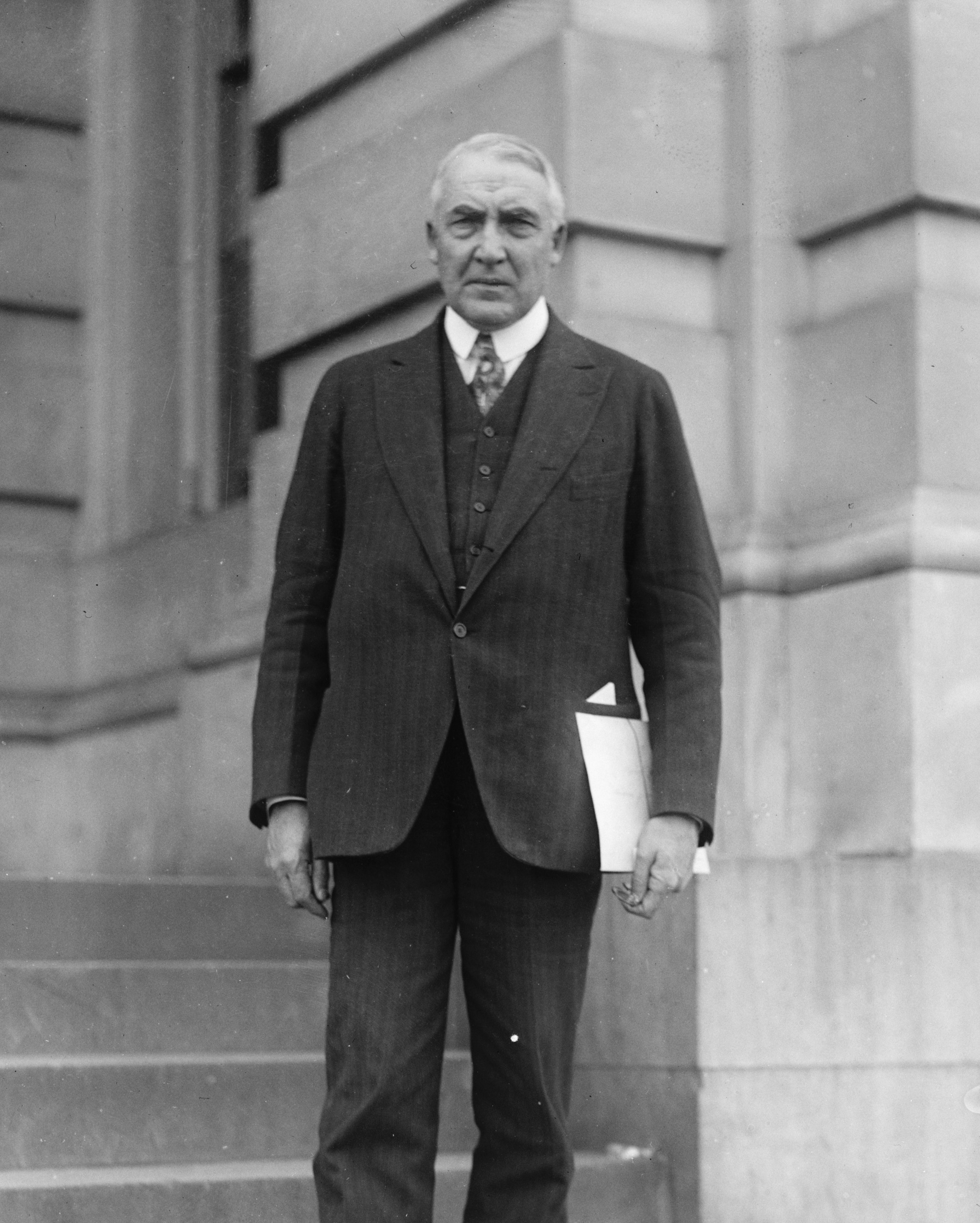
Harding c. 1919

With most Progressives having rejoined the Republican Party, their former leader, Theodore Roosevelt, was deemed likely to make a third run for the White House in 1920, and was the overwhelming favorite for the Republican nomination. These plans ended when Roosevelt suddenly died on January 6, 1919. A number of candidates quickly emerged, including General Leonard Wood, Illinois Governor Frank Lowden, California Senator Hiram Johnson (who had been Roosevelt's running mate in the 1912 election), and a host of relatively minor possibilities such as Herbert Hoover (renowned for his World War I relief work), Massachusetts Governor Calvin Coolidge, and General John J. Pershing.

Harding, while he wanted to be president, was as much motivated in entering the race by his desire to keep control of Ohio Republican politics, enabling his re-election to the Senate in 1920. Among those coveting Harding's seat were former governor Willis (he had been defeated by James M. Cox in 1916) and Colonel William Cooper Procter (head of Procter & Gamble). On December 17, 1919, Harding made a low-key announcement of his presidential candidacy. Leading Republicans disliked Wood and Johnson, both of the progressive faction of the party, and Lowden, who had an independent streak, was deemed little better. Harding was far more acceptable to the "Old Guard" leaders of the party.

Daugherty, who became Harding's campaign manager, was sure none of the other candidates could garner a majority. His strategy was to make Harding an acceptable choice to delegates once the leaders faltered. Daugherty established a "Harding for President" campaign office in Washington (run by his confidant, Jess Smith), and worked to manage a network of Harding friends and supporters, including Frank Scobey of Texas (clerk of the Ohio State Senate during Harding's years there). Harding worked to shore up his support through incessant letter-writing. Despite the candidate's work, according to Russell, "without Daugherty's Mephistophelean efforts, Harding would never have stumbled forward to the nomination."

America's present need is not heroics, but healing; not nostrums, but normalcy; not revolution, but restoration; not agitation, but adjustment; not surgery, but serenity; not the dramatic, but the dispassionate; not experiment, but equipoise; not submergence in internationality, but sustainment in triumphant nationality.

— Warren G. Harding, speech before the Home Market Club, Boston, May 14, 1920

There were only 16 presidential primary states in 1920, of which the most crucial to Harding was Ohio. Harding had to have some loyalists at the convention to have any chance of nomination, and the Wood campaign hoped to knock Harding out of the race by taking Ohio. Wood campaigned in the state, and his supporter, Procter, spent large sums; Harding spoke in the non-confrontational style he had adopted in 1914. Harding and Daugherty were so confident of sweeping Ohio's 48 delegates that the candidate went on to the next state, Indiana, before the April 27 Ohio primary. Harding carried Ohio by only 15,000 votes over Wood, taking less than half the total vote, and won only 39 of 48 delegates. In Indiana, Harding finished fourth, with less than ten percent of the vote, and failed to win a single delegate. He was willing to give up and have Daugherty file his re-election papers for the Senate, but Florence Harding grabbed the phone from his hand, "Warren Harding, what are you doing? Give up? Not until the convention is over. Think of your friends in Ohio!" On learning that Daugherty had left the phone line, the future First Lady retorted, "Well, you tell Harry Daugherty for me that we're in this fight until Hell freezes over."

After he recovered from the shock of the poor results, Harding traveled to Boston, where he delivered a speech that according to Dean, "would resonate throughout the 1920 campaign and history." There, he said that "America's present need is not heroics, but healing; not nostrums, but normalcy; (Note: Although Harding did not invent the word "normalcy", he is credited with popularizing it. See Russell, p. 347. The other word that Harding popularized was bloviate, which he said was a somewhat-obsolete term used in Ohio meaning to sit around and talk. After Harding's resurrection of it, it came to mean empty oratory. See Dean, p. 37.) not revolution, but restoration." Dean notes, "Harding, more than the other aspirants, was reading the nation's pulse correctly."

=== Convention ===
The 1920 Republican National Convention opened at the Chicago Coliseum on June 8, 1920, assembling delegates who were bitterly divided, most recently over the results of a Senate investigation into campaign spending, which had just been released. That report found that Wood had spent $1.8 million (equivalent to $28.93 million in 2025), lending substance to Johnson's claims that Wood was trying to buy the presidency. Some of the $600,000 that Lowden had spent had wound up in the pockets of two convention delegates. Johnson had spent $194,000, and Harding $113,000. Johnson was deemed to be behind the inquiry, and the rage of the Lowden and Wood factions put an end to any possible compromise among the frontrunners. Of the almost 1,000 delegates, 27 were women—the Nineteenth Amendment to the United States Constitution, guaranteeing women the vote, was within one state of ratification, and would pass before the end of August. The convention had no boss, most uninstructed delegates voted as they pleased, and with a Democrat in the White House, the party's leaders could not use patronage to get their way.

Reporters deemed Harding unlikely to be nominated due to his poor showing in the primaries, and relegated him to a place among the dark horses. Harding, who like the other candidates was in Chicago supervising his campaign, had finished sixth in the final public opinion poll, behind the three main candidates as well as former Justice Hughes and Herbert Hoover, and only slightly ahead of Coolidge.

After the convention dealt with other matters, the nominations for president opened on the morning of Friday, June 11. Harding had asked Willis to place his name in nomination, and the former governor responded with a speech popular among the delegates, both for its folksiness and for its brevity in the intense Chicago heat. Reporter Mark Sullivan, who was present, called it a splendid combination of "oratory, grand opera, and hog calling." Willis confided, leaning over the podium railing, "Say, boys—and girls too—why not name Warren Harding?" The laughter and applause that followed created a warm feeling for Harding.

I don't expect Senator Harding to be nominated on the first, second, or third ballots, but I think we can well afford to take chances that about eleven minutes after two o'clock on Friday morning at the convention, when fifteen or twenty men, somewhat weary, are sitting around a table, some one of them will say: "Who will we nominate?" At that decisive time, the friends of Senator Harding can suggest him and afford to abide by the result.

— Harry M. Daugherty

Four ballots were taken on the afternoon of June 11, and they revealed a deadlock. With 493 votes needed to nominate, Wood was the closest with 314 1/2; Lowden had 289 1/2. The best Harding had done was 65 1/2. Chairman Henry Cabot Lodge of Massachusetts, the Senate Majority Leader, adjourned the convention about 7 p.m.

The night of June 11–12, 1920 would become famous in political history as the night of the "smoke-filled room", in which, legend has it, party elders agreed to force the convention to nominate Harding. Historians have focused on the session held in the suite of Republican National Committee (RNC) Chairman Will Hays at the Blackstone Hotel, at which senators and others came and went, and numerous possible candidates were discussed. Utah Senator Reed Smoot, before his departure early in the evening, backed Harding, telling Hays and the others that as the Democrats were likely to nominate Governor Cox, they should pick Harding to win Ohio. Smoot also told The New York Times that there had been an agreement to nominate Harding, but that it would not be done for several ballots yet. This was not true: a number of participants backed Harding (others supported his rivals), but there was no pact to nominate him, and the senators had little power to enforce any agreement. Two other participants in the smoke-filled room discussions, Kansas Senator Charles Curtis and Colonel George Brinton McClellan Harvey, a close friend of Hays, predicted to the press that Harding would be nominated because of the liabilities of the other candidates.

Headlines in the morning newspapers suggested intrigue. Historian Wesley M. Bagby wrote, "Various groups actually worked along separate lines to bring about the nomination—without combination and with very little contact." Bagby said that the key factor in Harding's nomination was his wide popularity among the rank and file of the delegates.

The reassembled delegates had heard rumors that Harding was the choice of a cabal of senators. Although this was not true, delegates believed it, and sought a way out by voting for Harding. When balloting resumed on the morning of June 12, Harding gained votes on each of the next four ballots, rising to 133 1/2 as the two front runners saw little change. Lodge then declared a three-hour recess, to the outrage of Daugherty, who raced to the podium, and confronted him, "You cannot defeat this man this way! The motion was not carried! You cannot defeat this man!" Lodge and others used the break to try to stop the Harding momentum and make RNC Chairman Hays the nominee, a scheme Hays refused to have anything to do with. The ninth ballot, after some initial suspense, saw delegation after delegation break for Harding, who took the lead with 374 1/2 votes to 249 for Wood and 121 1/2 for Lowden (Johnson had 83). Lowden released his delegates to Harding, and the tenth ballot, held at 6 p.m., was a mere formality, with Harding finishing with 672 1/5 votes to 156 for Wood. The nomination was made unanimous. The delegates, desperate to leave town before they incurred more hotel expenses, then proceeded to the vice presidential nomination. Harding wanted Senator Irvine Lenroot of Wisconsin, who was unwilling to run, but before Lenroot's name could be withdrawn and another candidate decided on, Oregon delegate Wallace McCamant proposed Governor Coolidge and received a roar of approval. Coolidge, popular for his role in breaking the Boston police strike of 1919, was nominated for vice president, receiving two and a fraction votes more than Harding had. James Morgan wrote in The Boston Globe: "The delegates would not listen to remaining in Chicago over Sunday ... the President makers did not have a clean shirt. On such things, Rollo, turns the destiny of nations."

=== General election campaign ===
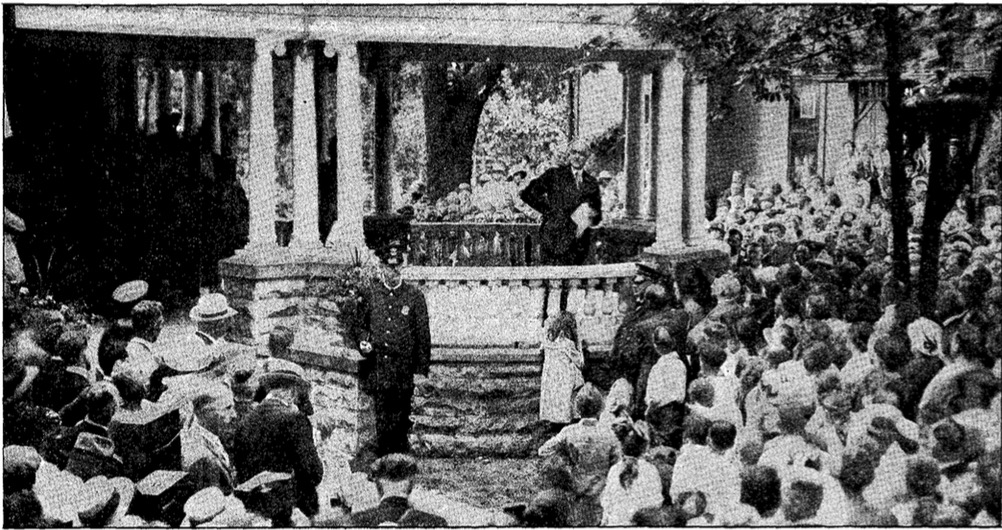
Harding begins his front porch campaign by accepting the Republican nomination, July 22, 1920.

The Harding/Coolidge ticket was quickly backed by Republican newspapers, but those of other viewpoints expressed disappointment. The New York World found Harding the least-qualified candidate since James Buchanan, deeming the Ohio senator a "weak and mediocre" man who "never had an original idea." The Hearst newspapers called Harding "the flag-bearer of a new Senatorial autocracy." The New York Times described the Republican presidential candidate as "a very respectable Ohio politician of the second class."

The Democratic National Convention opened in San Francisco on June 28, 1920, under a shadow cast by Woodrow Wilson, who wished to be nominated for a third term. Delegates were convinced Wilson's health would not permit him to serve, and looked elsewhere for a candidate. Former Treasury Secretary William G. McAdoo was a major contender, but he was Wilson's son-in-law, and refused to consider a nomination so long as the president wanted it. Many at the convention voted for McAdoo anyway, and a deadlock ensued with Attorney General A. Mitchell Palmer. On the 44th ballot, the Democrats nominated Governor Cox for president, with his running mate Assistant Secretary of the Navy Franklin D. Roosevelt. As Cox was a newspaper owner and editor, this placed two Ohio editors against each other for the presidency, and some complained there was no real political choice as both Cox and Harding were seen as economic conservatives. But ideologically, the candidates were distinctly different, with Cox a liberal and Harding a conservative.

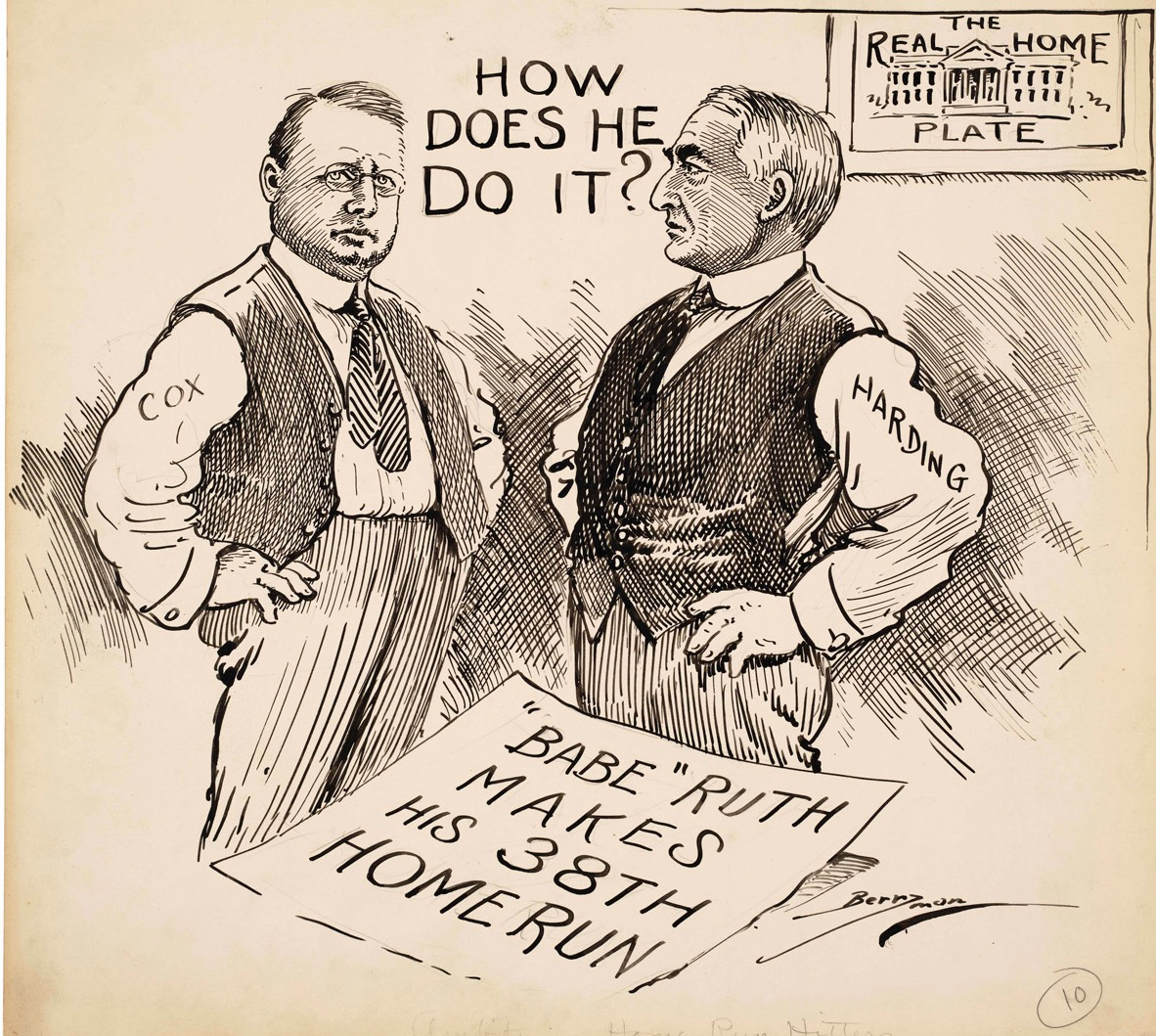
"How Does He Do It?" In this Clifford Berryman cartoon, Harding and Cox ponder another big story of 1920: Babe Ruth's record-setting home run pace.

Harding elected to conduct a front porch campaign, like McKinley in 1896. Some years earlier, Harding had had his front porch remodeled to resemble McKinley's, which his neighbors felt signified presidential ambitions. The candidate remained at home in Marion, and gave addresses to visiting delegations. In the meantime, Cox and Roosevelt stumped the nation, giving hundreds of speeches. Coolidge spoke in the Northeast, later on in the South, and was not a significant factor in the election.

In Marion, Harding ran his campaign. As a newspaperman himself, he fell into easy camaraderie with the press covering him, enjoying a relationship few presidents have equaled. His "return to normalcy" theme was aided by the atmosphere that Marion provided, an orderly place that induced nostalgia in many voters. The front porch campaign allowed Harding to avoid mistakes, and as time dwindled towards the election, his strength grew. The travels of the Democratic candidates eventually caused Harding to make several short speaking tours, but for the most part, he remained in Marion. The United States had no need for another Wilson, Harding argued, appealing for a president "near the normal".

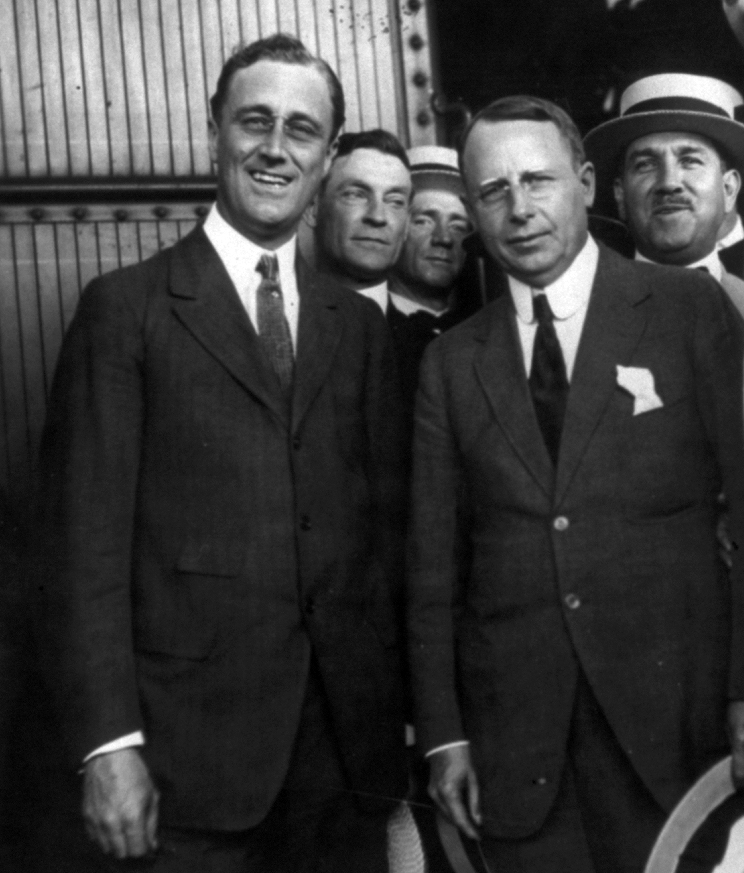
Democratic candidates Cox (right) and Roosevelt at a campaign appearance in Washington, D.C., 1920

Harding's vague oratory irritated some; McAdoo described a typical Harding speech as "an army of pompous phrases moving over the landscape in search of an idea. Sometimes these meandering words actually capture a straggling thought and bear it triumphantly, a prisoner in their midst, until it died of servitude and over work." H. L. Mencken concurred, "it reminds me of a string of wet sponges, it reminds me of tattered washing on the line; it reminds me of stale bean soup, of college yells, of dogs barking idiotically through endless nights. It is so bad that a kind of grandeur creeps into it. It drags itself out of the dark abysm ... of pish, and crawls insanely up the topmost pinnacle of tosh. It is rumble and bumble. It is balder and dash." (Note: Mencken nevertheless voted for Harding. See Sinclair, p. 165.) The New York Times took a more positive view of Harding's speeches, writing that in them the majority of people could find "a reflection of their own indeterminate thoughts."

Wilson had said that the 1920 election would be a "great and solemn referendum" on the League of Nations, making it difficult for Cox to maneuver on the issue—although Roosevelt strongly supported the League, Cox was less enthusiastic. Harding opposed entry into the League of Nations as negotiated by Wilson, but favored an "association of nations," based on the Permanent Court of Arbitration at The Hague. This was general enough to satisfy most Republicans, and only a few bolted the party over this issue. By October, Cox had realized there was widespread public opposition to Article X, and said that reservations to the treaty might be necessary; this shift allowed Harding to say no more on the subject.

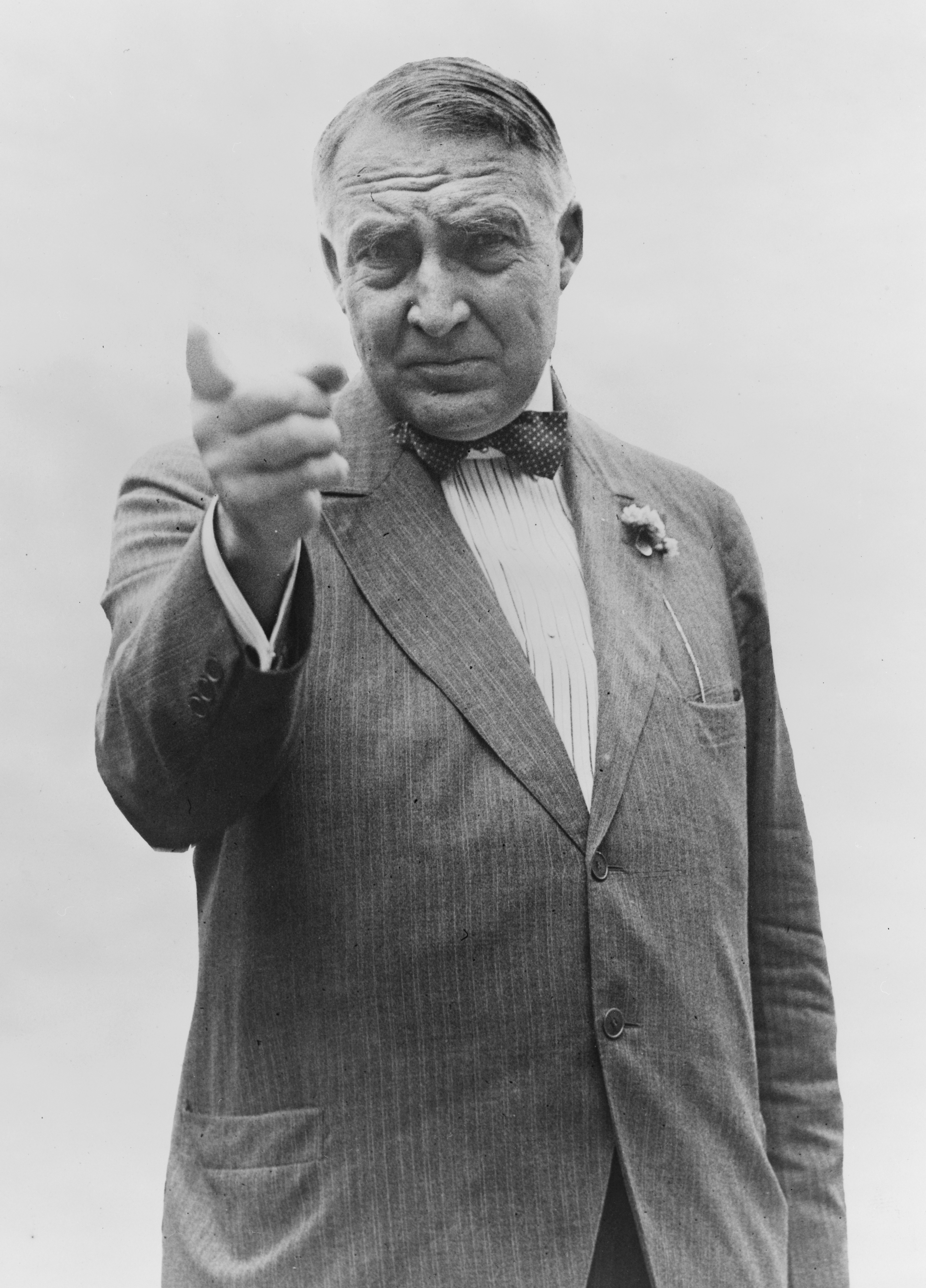
Harding campaigning in 1920

The RNC hired Albert Lasker, an advertising executive from Chicago, to publicize Harding, and Lasker unleashed a broad-based advertising campaign that used many now-standard advertising techniques for the first time in a presidential campaign. Lasker's approach included newsreels and sound recordings. Visitors to Marion had their photographs taken with Senator and Mrs. Harding, and copies were sent to their hometown newspapers. Billboard posters, newspapers and magazines were employed in addition to motion pictures. Telemarketers were used to make phone calls with scripted dialogues to promote Harding.

During the campaign, opponents spread old rumors that Harding's great-great-grandfather was a West Indian black person and that other blacks might be found in his family tree. Harding's campaign manager rejected the accusations. Wooster College professor William Estabrook Chancellor publicized the rumors, based on supposed family research, but perhaps reflecting no more than local gossip.

1920 electoral vote results

By Election Day, November 2, 1920, few had any doubts that the Republican ticket would win. Harding received 60.2 percent of the popular vote, the highest percentage since the evolution of the two-party system, and 404 electoral votes. Cox received 34 percent of the national vote and 127 electoral votes. Campaigning from a federal prison where he was serving a sentence for opposing the war, Socialist Eugene V. Debs received 3 percent of the national vote. The Republicans greatly increased their majority in each house of Congress.

== Presidency (1921–1923) ==
=== Inauguration and appointments ===
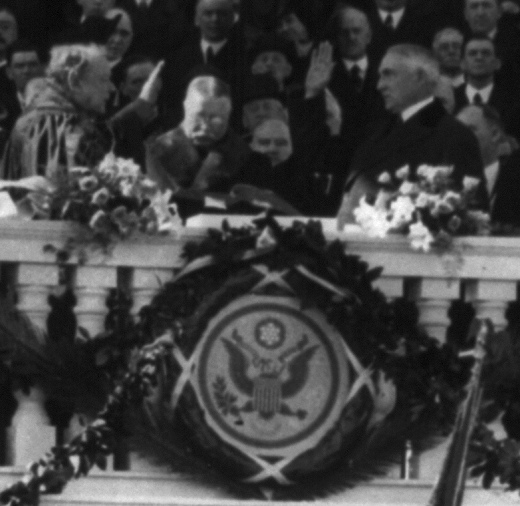
Harding takes the oath of office.

Harding was inaugurated on March 4, 1921, in the presence of his wife and father. Harding preferred a subdued inauguration without the customary parade, leaving only the actual ceremony and a brief reception at the White House. In his inaugural address, he declared, "Our most dangerous tendency is to expect too much from the government and at the same time do too little for it."

After the election, Harding announced that no decisions about appointments would be made until he returned from a vacation in December. He traveled to Texas, where he fished and played golf with his friend Frank Scobey (soon to be director of the Mint) and then sailed for the Panama Canal Zone. He visited Washington when Congress opened in early December, and he was afforded a hero's welcome as the first sitting senator to be elected to the White House. (Note: Harding resigned from the Senate in January 1921, waiting until Cox's term as governor expired. A Republican governor, Harry L. Davis, appointed Willis, already elected to a full term on Harding's coattails, to serve the remainder of Harding's term. See Dean, p. 92.) Back in Ohio, Harding planned to consult with the country's best minds, who visited Marion to offer their counsel regarding appointments.

Harding chose pro-League Charles Evans Hughes as Secretary of State, ignoring the advice of Senator Lodge and others. After Charles G. Dawes declined the Treasury position, he chose Pittsburgh banker Andrew W. Mellon, one of the richest people in the country. He appointed Herbert Hoover as Secretary of Commerce. RNC chairman Will Hays was made Postmaster General, then a cabinet post; he left after a year in the position to become chief censor to the motion-picture industry.

The two Harding cabinet appointees who darkened the reputation of his administration by their involvement in scandal were Harding's Senate friend Albert B. Fall of New Mexico, the Interior Secretary, and Daugherty, the attorney general. Fall was a Western rancher and former miner who favored development. He was opposed by conservationists such as Gifford Pinchot, who wrote, "it would have been possible to pick a worse man for Secretary of the Interior, but not altogether easy." The New York Times mocked the Daugherty appointment, writing that rather than selecting one of the best minds, Harding had been content "to choose merely a best friend." Eugene P. Trani and David L. Wilson, in their volume on Harding's presidency, suggest that the appointment made sense then, as Daugherty was "a competent lawyer well-acquainted with the seamy side of politics ... a first-class political troubleshooter and someone Harding could trust."

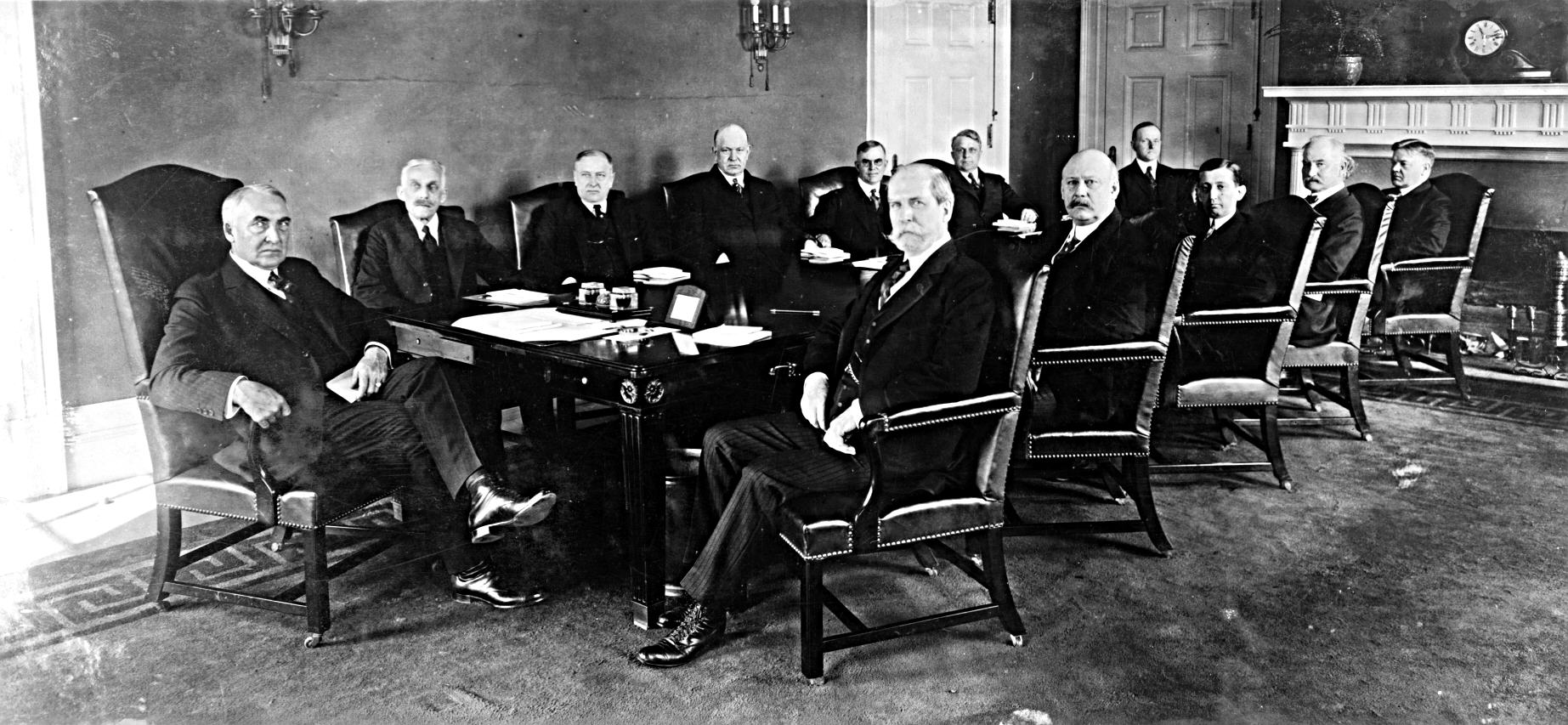
Harding's original Cabinet, 1921

Harding cabinet
Office	Name	Term
President	Warren G. Harding	1921–1923
Vice President	Calvin Coolidge	1921–1923
Secretary of State	Charles Evans Hughes	1921–1923
Secretary of the Treasury	Andrew Mellon	1921–1923
Secretary of War	John W. Weeks	1921–1923
Attorney General	Harry M. Daugherty	1921–1923
Postmaster General	Will H. Hays	1921–1922
Hubert Work	1922–1923
Harry Stewart New	1923
Secretary of the Navy	Edwin Denby	1921–1923
Secretary of the Interior	Albert B. Fall	1921–1923
Hubert Work	1923
Secretary of Agriculture	Henry Cantwell Wallace	1921–1923
Secretary of Commerce	Herbert Hoover	1921–1923
Secretary of Labor	James J. Davis	1921–1923

=== Foreign policy ===
==== European relations and formally ending the war ====
Warren G. Harding explains his unwillingness to have the U.S. join the League of Nations.

Harding made it clear when he appointed Hughes as Secretary of State that the former justice would run foreign policy, a change from Wilson's hands-on management of international affairs. Hughes had to work within some broad outlines; after taking office, Harding hardened his stance on the League of Nations, deciding the U.S. would not join even a scaled-down version of the League. With the Treaty of Versailles unratified by the Senate, the U.S. remained technically at war with Germany, Austria, and Hungary. Peacemaking began with the Knox–Porter Resolution, declaring the U.S. at peace and reserving any rights granted under Versailles. Treaties with Germany, Austria and Hungary, each containing many of the non-League provisions of the Treaty of Versailles, were ratified in 1921.

This still left the question of relations between the U.S. and the League. Hughes's State Department initially ignored communications from the League, or tried to bypass it through direct contacts with member nations. By 1922, though, the U.S., through its consul in Geneva, was dealing with the League, and though the U.S. refused to participate in any meeting with political implications, it sent observers to sessions on technical and humanitarian matters.

By the time Harding took office, there were calls from foreign governments for reduction of the massive war debt owed to the United States, and the German government sought to reduce the reparations that it was required to pay. The U.S. refused to consider any multilateral settlement. Harding sought passage of a plan proposed by Mellon to give the administration broad authority to reduce war debts in negotiation, but Congress, in 1922, passed a more restrictive bill. Hughes negotiated an agreement for Britain to pay off its war debt over 62 years at low interest, reducing the present value of the obligations. This agreement, approved by Congress in 1923, served as a model for negotiations with other nations. Talks with Germany on reduction of reparations payments resulted in the Dawes Plan of 1924.

A pressing issue not resolved by Wilson was U.S. policy towards Bolshevik Russia. The U.S. had been among the nations that sent troops there after the Russian Revolution. Afterwards, Wilson refused to recognize the Russian SFSR. Harding's Commerce Secretary Hoover, with considerable experience in Russian affairs, took the lead on policy. When famine struck Russia in 1921, Hoover had the American Relief Administration, which he had headed, negotiate with the Russians to provide aid. Leaders of the U.S.S.R. (established in 1922) hoped in vain that the agreement would lead to recognition. Hoover supported trade with the Soviets, fearing U.S. companies would be frozen out of the Soviet market, but Hughes opposed this, and the matter was not resolved under Harding's presidency.

==== Disarmament ====
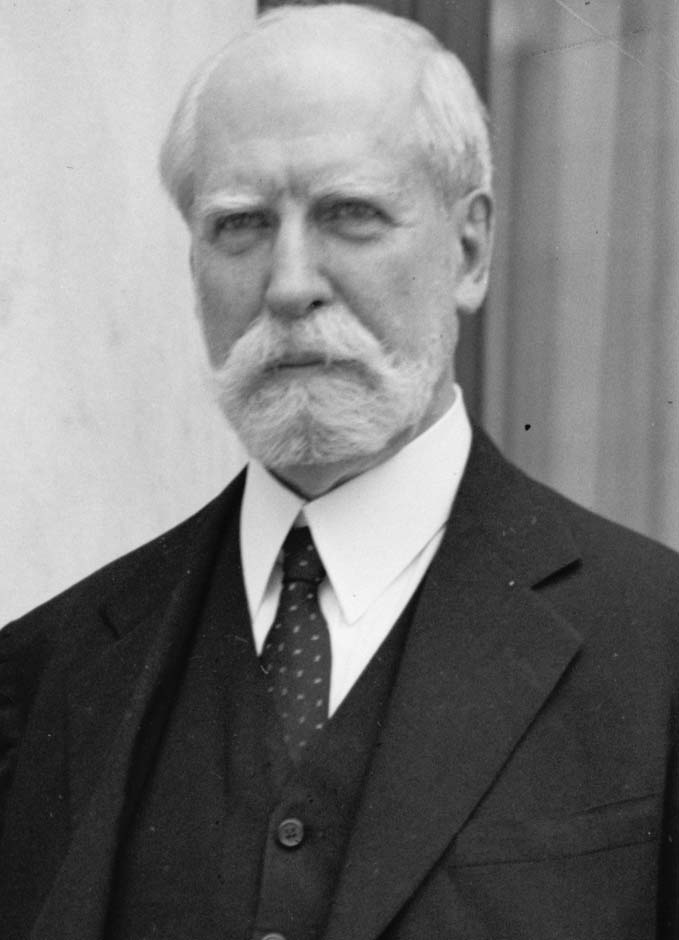
Charles Evans Hughes, former Supreme Court justice and Harding's Secretary of State

Harding urged disarmament and lower defense costs during the campaign, but it had not been a major issue. He gave a speech to a joint session of Congress in April 1921, setting out his legislative priorities. Among the few foreign policy matters he mentioned was disarmament; he said the government could not "be unmindful of the call for reduced expenditure" on defense.

Idaho Senator William Borah had proposed a conference at which the major naval powers, the U.S., Britain, and Japan, would agree to cuts in their fleets. Harding concurred, and after diplomatic discussions, representatives of nine nations convened in Washington in November 1921. Most of the diplomats first attended Armistice Day ceremonies at Arlington National Cemetery, where Harding spoke at the entombment of the Unknown Soldier of World War I, whose identity, "took flight with his imperishable soul. We know not whence he came, only that his death marks him with the everlasting glory of an American dying for his country."

Hughes, in his speech at the opening session of the conference on November 12, 1921, made the American proposal—the U.S. would decommission or not build 30 warships if Great Britain did likewise for 19 vessels, and Japan for 17. Hughes was generally successful, with agreements reached on this and other points, including settlement of disputes over islands in the Pacific, and limitations on the use of poison gas. The naval agreement applied only to battleships, and to some extent aircraft carriers, and ultimately did not prevent rearmament. Nevertheless, Harding and Hughes were widely applauded in the press for their work. Senator Lodge and the Senate Minority Leader, Alabama's Oscar Underwood, were part of the U.S. delegation, and they helped ensure the treaties made it through the Senate mostly unscathed, though that body added reservations to some.

The U.S. had acquired over a thousand vessels during World War I, and still owned most of them when Harding took office. Congress had authorized their disposal in 1920, but the Senate would not confirm Wilson's nominees to the Shipping Board. Harding appointed Albert Lasker as its chairman; the advertising executive undertook to run the fleet as profitably as possible until it could be sold. Few ships were marketable at anything approaching the government's cost. Lasker recommended a large subsidy to the merchant marine to facilitate sales, and Harding repeatedly urged Congress to enact it. The resulting bill was unpopular in the Midwest, and though it passed the House, it was defeated by a filibuster in the Senate, and most government ships were eventually scrapped.

==== Latin America ====
Intervention in Latin America had been a minor campaign issue, though Harding spoke against Wilson's decision to send U.S. troops to the Dominican Republic and Haiti, and attacked the Democratic vice presidential candidate, Franklin Roosevelt, for his role in the Haitian intervention. Once Harding was sworn in, Hughes worked to improve relations with Latin American countries who were wary of the American use of the Monroe Doctrine to justify intervention; at the time of Harding's inauguration, the U.S. also had troops in Cuba and Nicaragua. The troops stationed in Cuba were withdrawn in 1921, but U.S. forces remained in the other three nations throughout Harding's presidency. (Note: By Hughes's departure from office in 1925, American forces had left the Dominican Republic and were about to leave Nicaragua. The departure from Haiti was still being planned. See Trani & Wilson, p. 135.) In April 1921, Harding gained the ratification of the Thomson–Urrutia Treaty with Colombia, granting that nation $25 million (equivalent to $451.26 million in 2025) as settlement for the U.S.-provoked Panamanian revolution of 1903. The Latin American nations were not fully satisfied, as the U.S. refused to renounce interventionism, though Hughes pledged to limit it to nations near the Panama Canal, and to make it clear what the U.S. aims were.

The U.S. had intervened repeatedly in Mexico under Wilson, and had withdrawn diplomatic recognition, setting conditions for reinstatement. The Mexican government under President Álvaro Obregón wanted recognition before negotiations, but Wilson and his final Secretary of State, Bainbridge Colby, refused. Both Hughes and Fall opposed recognition; Hughes instead sent a draft treaty to the Mexicans in May 1921, which included pledges to reimburse Americans for losses in Mexico since the 1910 revolution there. Obregón was unwilling to sign a treaty before being recognized, and worked to improve the relationship between American business and Mexico, reaching agreement with creditors, and mounting a public relations campaign in the United States. This had its effect, and by mid-1922, Fall was less influential than he had been, lessening the resistance to recognition. The two presidents appointed commissioners to reach a deal, and the U.S. recognized the Obregón government on August 31, 1923, just under a month after Harding's death, substantially on the terms proffered by Mexico.

=== Domestic policy ===
==== Postwar recession and recovery ====
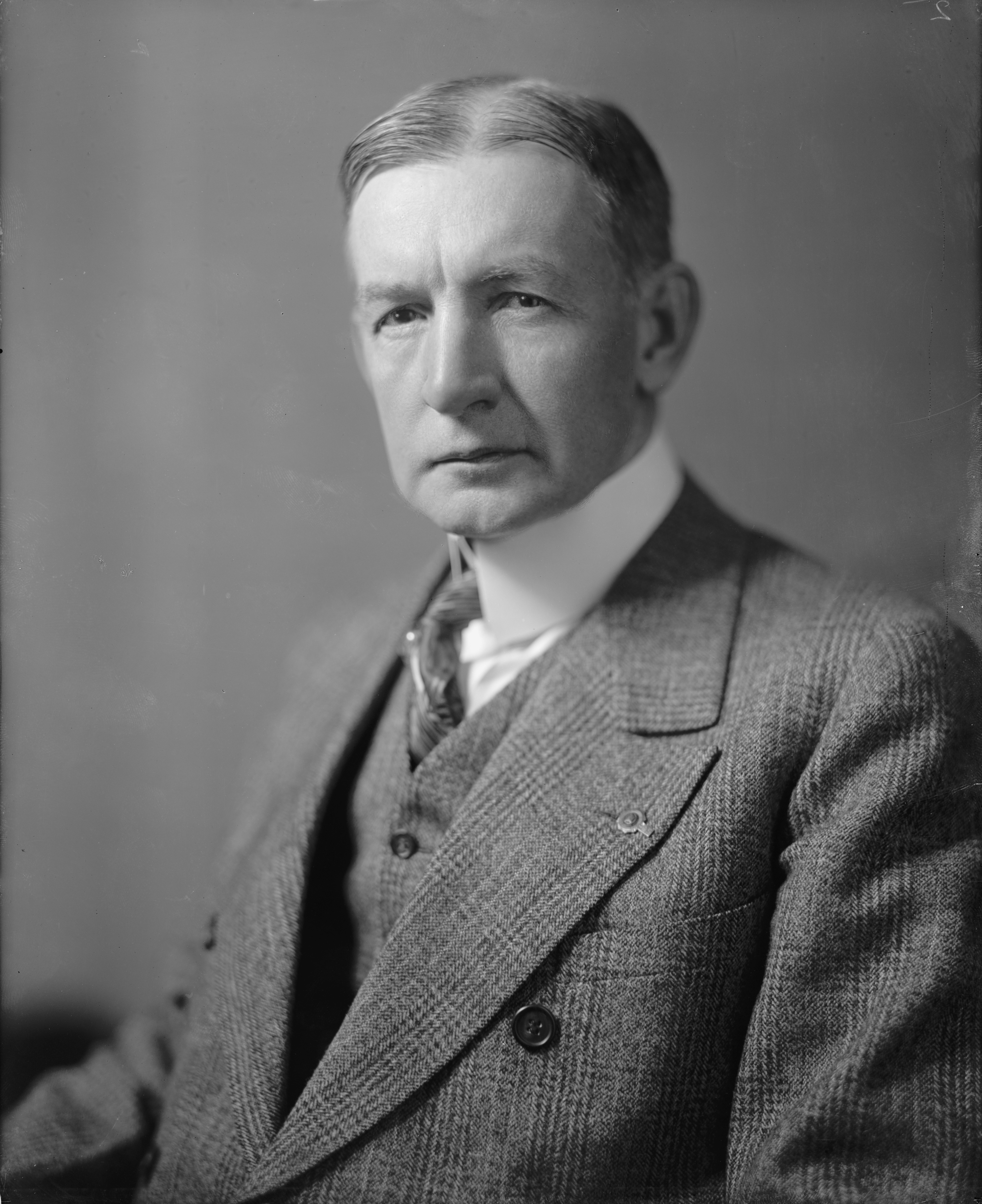
Charles Dawes—the first budget director and later, vice president under Coolidge

When Harding took office on March 4, 1921, the nation was in the midst of a postwar economic decline. At the suggestion of legislative leaders, Harding called a special session of Congress, to convene April 11. When Harding addressed the joint session the following day, he urged the reduction of income taxes (raised during the war), an increase in tariffs on agricultural goods to protect the American farmer, as well as more wide-ranging reforms, such as support for highways, aviation, and radio. It was not until May 27 that Congress passed an emergency tariff increase on agricultural products. An act authorizing a Bureau of the Budget followed on June 10, and Harding appointed Charles Dawes as bureau director with a mandate to cut expenditures.

==== Mellon's tax cuts ====
Treasury Secretary Mellon also recommended that Congress cut income tax rates, and that the corporate excess profits tax be abolished. The House Ways and Means Committee endorsed Mellon's proposals, but some congressmen wanting to raise corporate tax rates fought the measure. Harding was unsure what side to endorse, telling a friend, "I can't make a damn thing out of this tax problem. I listen to one side, and they seem right, and then—God!—I talk to the other side, and they seem just as right." Harding tried compromise, and gained passage of a bill in the House after the end of the excess profits tax was delayed a year. In the Senate, the bill became entangled in efforts to vote World War I veterans a soldier's bonus. Frustrated by the delays, on July 12, Harding appeared before the Senate to urge passage of the tax legislation without the bonus. It was not until November that the revenue bill finally passed, with higher rates than Mellon had proposed.

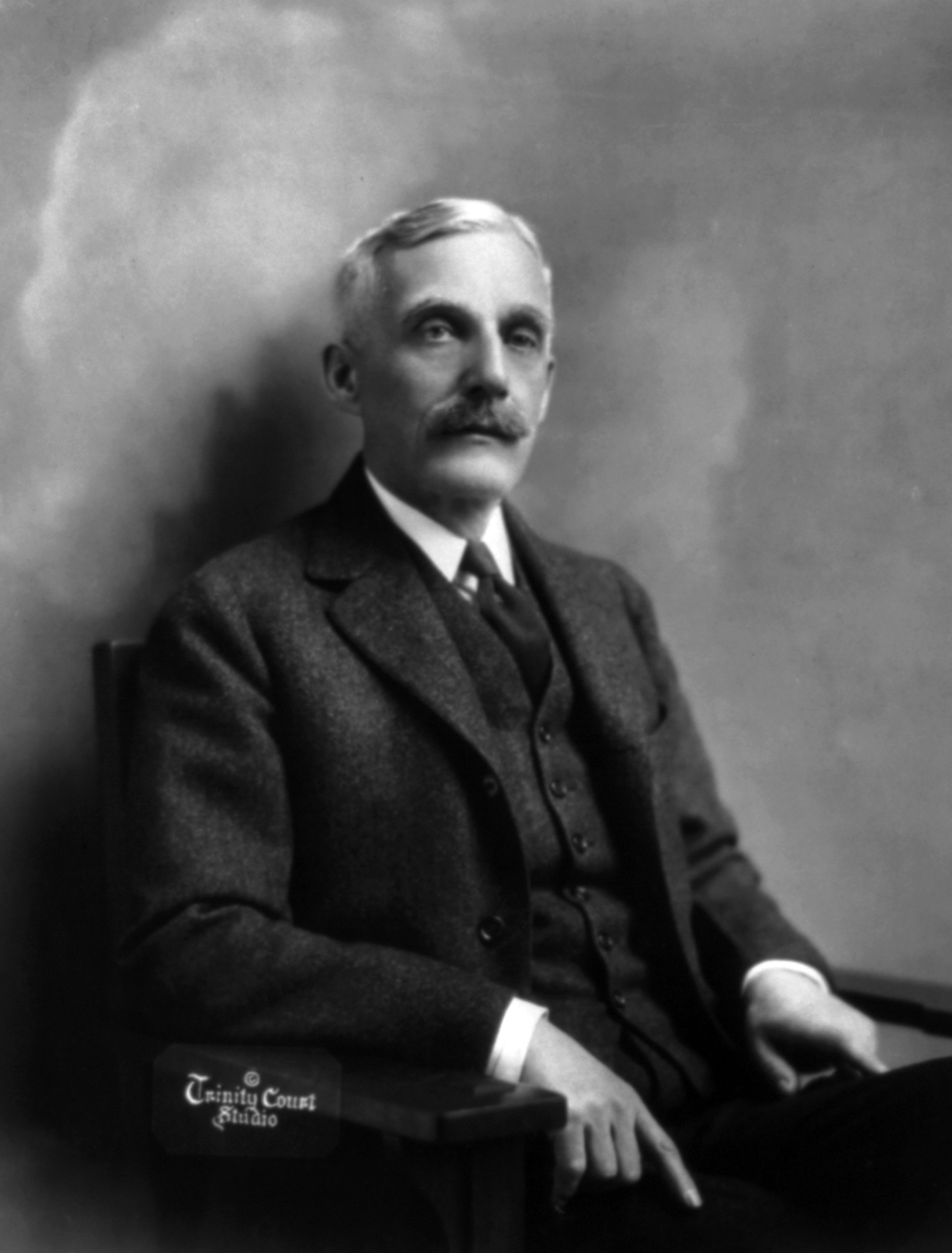
Secretary of the Treasury Andrew W. Mellon advocated lower tax rates.

In opposing the veterans' bonus, Harding argued in his Senate address that much was already being done for them by a grateful nation, and that the bill would "break down our Treasury, from which so much is later on to be expected". The Senate sent the bonus bill back to committee, but the issue returned when Congress reconvened in December 1921. A bill providing a bonus, though unfunded, was passed by both houses in September 1922, but Harding's veto was narrowly sustained. A non-cash bonus for soldiers passed over Coolidge's veto in 1924.

In his first annual message to Congress, Harding sought the power to adjust tariff rates. The passage of the tariff bill in the Senate, and in conference committee became a feeding frenzy of lobby interests. When Harding signed the Fordney–McCumber Tariff Act on September 21, 1922, he made a brief statement, praising the bill only for giving him some power to change rates. According to Trani and Wilson, the bill was "ill-considered. It wrought havoc in international commerce and made the repayment of war debts more difficult."

Mellon ordered a study that demonstrated historically that, as income tax rates were increased, money was driven underground or abroad, and he concluded that lower rates would increase tax revenues. Based on his advice, Harding's revenue bill cut taxes, starting in 1922. The top marginal rate was reduced annually in four stages from 73% in 1921 to 25% in 1925. Taxes were cut for lower incomes starting in 1923, and the lower rates substantially increased the money flowing to the treasury. They also pushed massive deregulation, and federal spending as a share of GDP fell from 6.5% to 3.5%. By late 1922, the economy began to turn around. Unemployment was pared from its 1921 high of 12% to an average of 3.3% for the remainder of the decade. The misery index, a combined measure of unemployment and inflation, had its sharpest decline in U.S. history under Harding. Wages, profits, and productivity all made substantial gains; annual GDP increases averaged at over 5% during the 1920s. Libertarian historians Larry Schweikart and Michael Allen argue that, "Mellon's tax policies set the stage for the most amazing growth yet seen in America's already impressive economy."

==== Embracing new technologies ====
The 1920s were a time of modernization for America—use of electricity became increasingly common. Mass production of motorized vehicles stimulated other industries as well, such as highway construction, rubber, steel, and building, as hotels were erected to accommodate the tourists venturing upon the roads. This economic boost helped bring the nation out of the recession. To improve and expand the nation's highway system, Harding signed the Federal Highway Act of 1921. From 1921 to 1923, the federal government spent $162 million (equivalent to $3.1 billion in 2025) on America's highway system, infusing the U.S. economy with a large amount of capital. In 1922, Harding proclaimed that America was in the age of the "motor car", which "reflects our standard of living and gauges the speed of our present-day life".

Harding urged regulation of radio broadcasting in his April 1921 speech to Congress. Commerce Secretary Hoover took charge of this project, and convened a conference of radio broadcasters in 1922, which led to a voluntary agreement for licensing of radio frequencies through the Commerce Department. Both Harding and Hoover realized something more than an agreement was needed, but Congress was slow to act, not imposing radio regulation until 1927.

Harding also wished to promote aviation, and Hoover again took the lead, convening a national conference on commercial aviation. The discussions focused on safety matters, inspection of airplanes, and licensing of pilots. Harding again promoted legislation but nothing was done until 1926, when the Air Commerce Act created the Bureau of Aeronautics within Hoover's Commerce Department.

==== Business and labor ====
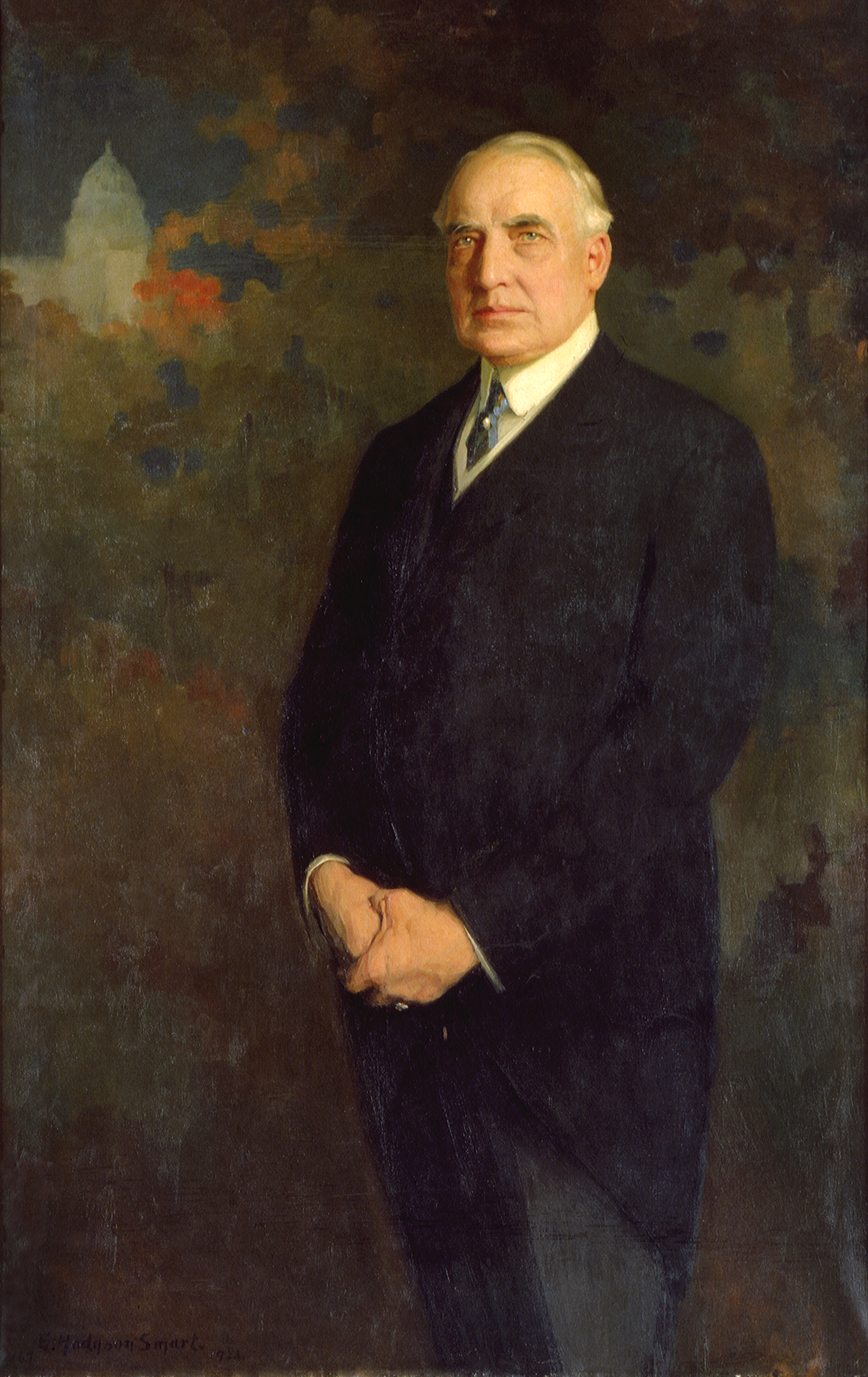
Harding's official White House portrait, c. 1922 by Edmund Hodgson Smart

Harding's attitude toward business was that government should aid it as much as possible. He was suspicious of organized labor, viewing it as a conspiracy against business. He sought to get them to work together at a conference on unemployment that he called to meet in September 1921 at Hoover's recommendation. Harding warned in his opening address that no federal money would be available. No important legislation came as a result, though some public works projects were accelerated.

Within broad limits, Harding allowed each cabinet secretary to run his department as he saw fit. Hoover expanded the Commerce Department to make it more useful to business. This was consistent with Hoover's view that the private sector should take the lead in managing the economy. Harding greatly respected his Commerce Secretary, often asked his advice, and backed him to the hilt, calling Hoover "the smartest 'gink' I know".

Widespread strikes marked 1922, as labor sought redress for falling wages and increased unemployment. In April, 500,000 coal miners, led by John L. Lewis, struck over wage cuts. Mining executives argued that the industry was seeing hard times; Lewis accused them of trying to break the union. As the strike became protracted, Harding offered compromise to settle it. As Harding proposed, the miners agreed to return to work, and Congress created a commission to look into their grievances.

On July 1, 1922, 400,000 railroad workers went on strike. Harding recommended a settlement that made some concessions, but management objected. Attorney General Daugherty convinced Judge James H. Wilkerson to issue a sweeping injunction to break the strike. Although there was public support for the Wilkerson injunction, Harding felt it went too far, and had Daugherty and Wilkerson amend it. The injunction ended the strike but tensions remained high between railroad workers and management for years.

By 1922, the eight-hour day had become common in American industry. One exception was in steel mills, where workers labored through a twelve-hour workday, seven days a week. Hoover considered this practice barbaric and got Harding to convene a conference of steel manufacturers with a view to ending the system. The conference established a committee under the leadership of U. S. Steel chairman Elbert Gary, which in early 1923 recommended against ending the practice. Harding sent a letter to Gary deploring the result, which was printed in the press, and public outcry caused the manufacturers to reverse themselves and standardize the eight-hour day.

==== Civil rights and immigration ====
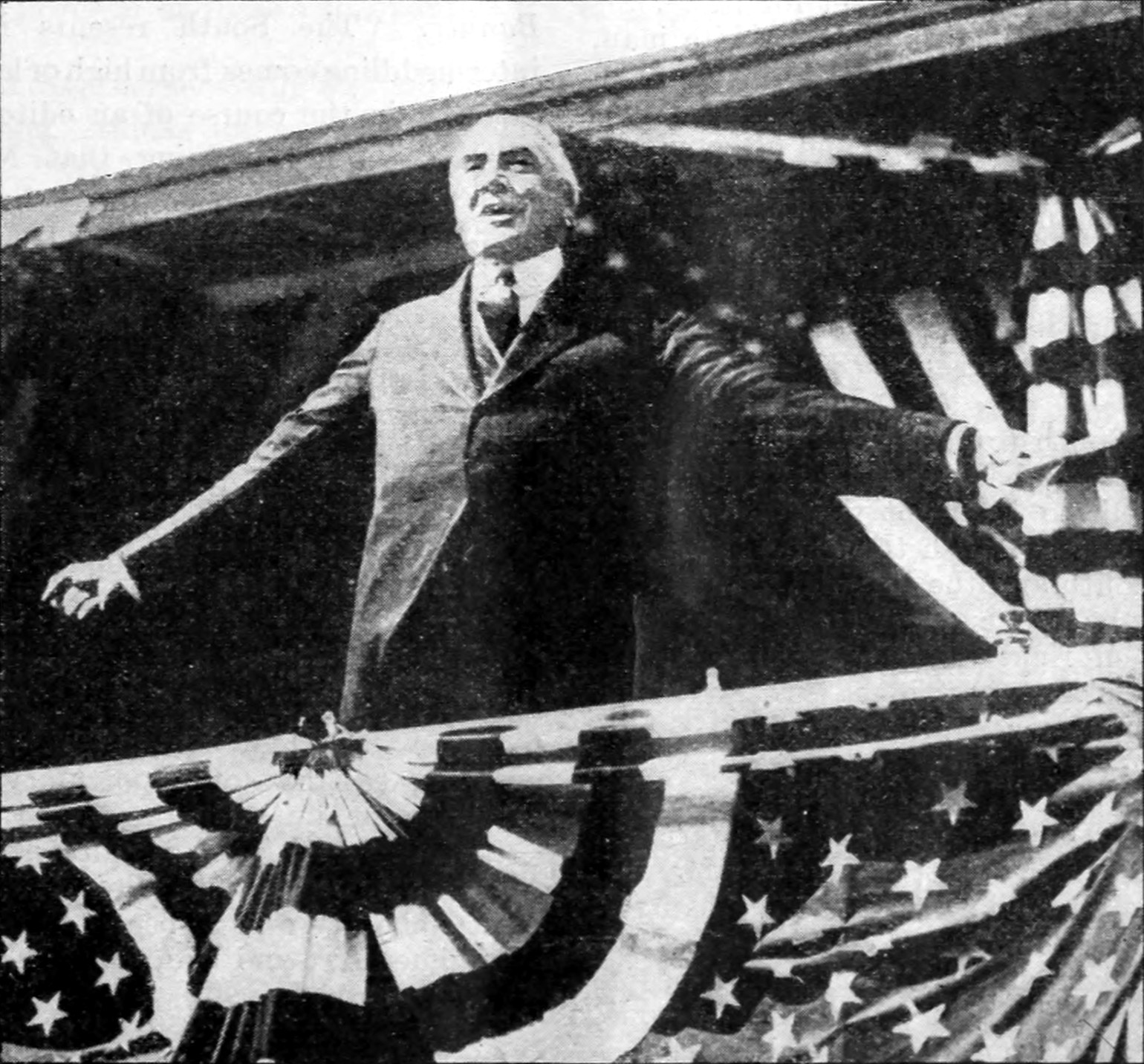
Harding addresses the segregated crowd in Birmingham, Alabama, October 26, 1921.

Although Harding's first address to Congress called for passage of anti-lynching legislation, he initially seemed inclined to do no more for African Americans than Republican presidents of the recent past had; he asked Cabinet officers to find places for blacks in their departments. Sinclair suggested that the fact that Harding received two-fifths of the Southern vote in 1920 led him to see political opportunity for his party in the Solid South. On October 26, 1921, Harding gave a speech in Birmingham, Alabama, to a segregated audience of 20,000 Whites and 10,000 Blacks. Harding, while saying that the social and racial differences between Whites and Blacks could not be bridged, urged equal political rights for the latter. Many African-Americans at that time voted Republican, especially in the Democratic South, and Harding said he did not mind seeing that support end if the result was a strong two-party system in the South. He was willing to see literacy tests for voting continue, if applied fairly to White and Black voters. "Whether you like it or not," Harding told his segregated audience, "unless our democracy is a lie, you must stand for that equality." The White section of the audience listened in silence, while the Black section cheered. Three days after the Tulsa race massacre of 1921, Harding spoke at the all-Black Lincoln University in Pennsylvania. He declared, "Despite the demagogues, the idea of our oneness as Americans has risen superior to every appeal to mere class and group. And so, I wish it might be in this matter of our national problem of races." Speaking directly about the events in Tulsa, he said, "God grant that, in the soberness, the fairness, and the justice of this country, we never see another spectacle like it."

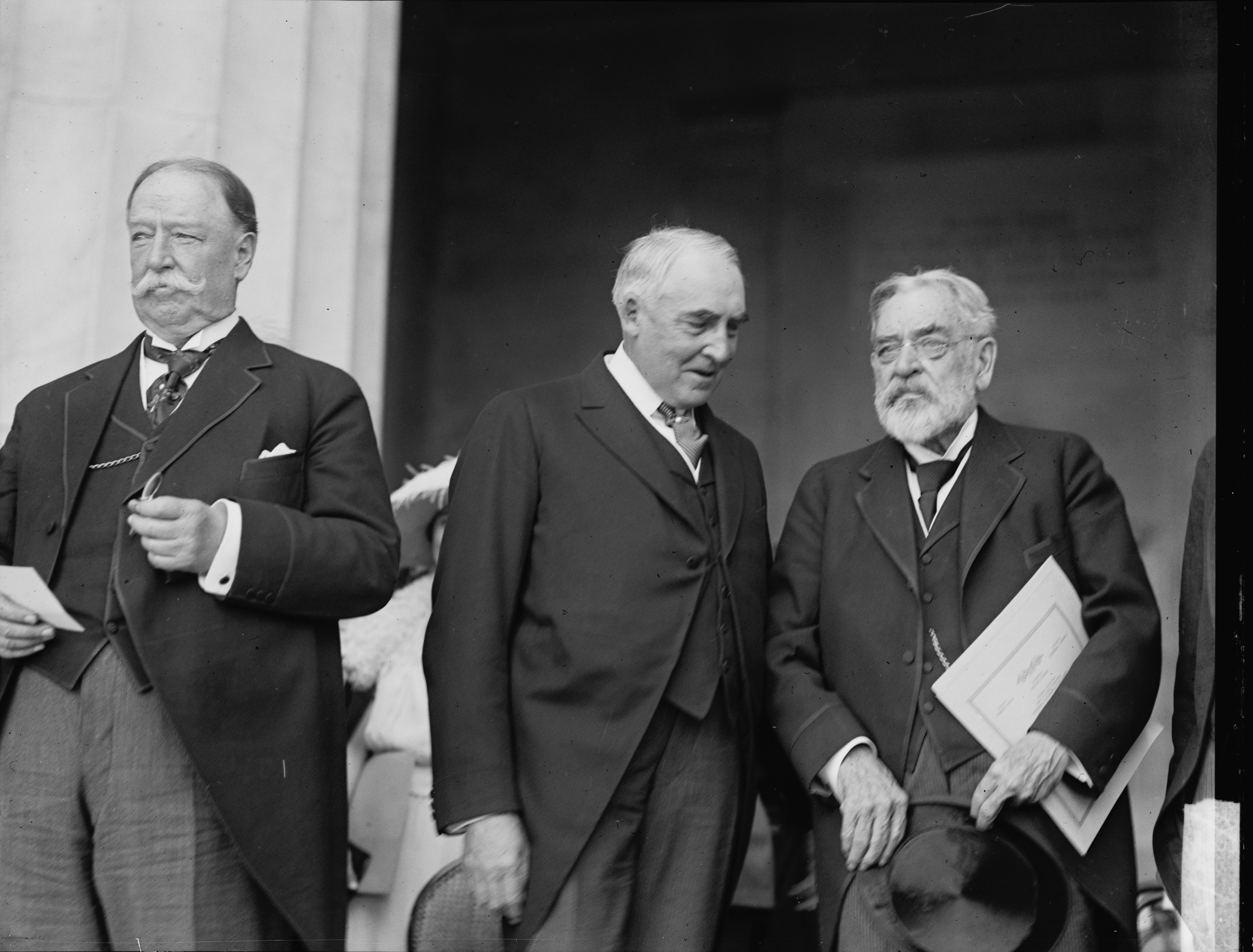
Harding (center) with Chief Justice Taft (left) and Robert Todd Lincoln at the dedication of the Lincoln Memorial, May 30, 1922

Harding supported Congressman Leonidas Dyer's federal anti-lynching bill, which passed the House of Representatives in January 1922. When it reached the Senate floor in November 1922, it was filibustered by Southern Democrats, and Lodge withdrew it to allow the ship subsidy bill Harding favored to be debated, though it was likewise blocked. Blacks blamed Harding for the Dyer bill's defeat; Harding biographer Robert K. Murray noted that it was hastened to its end by Harding's desire to have the ship subsidy bill considered.

With the public suspicious of immigrants, especially those who might be socialists or communists, Congress passed the Per Centum Act of 1921, signed by Harding on May 19, 1921, as a quick means of restricting immigration. The act reduced the numbers of immigrants to 3% of those from a given country living in the U.S., based on the 1910 census. This would, in practice, not restrict immigration from Ireland and Germany, but would bar many Italians and eastern European Jews. Harding and Secretary of Labor James Davis believed that enforcement had to be humane, and at the Secretary's recommendation, Harding allowed almost 1,000 deportable immigrants to remain. Coolidge later signed the Immigration Act of 1924, permanently restricting immigration to the U.S.

==== Eugene Debs and political prisoners ====
Harding's Socialist opponent in the 1920 election, Eugene Debs, was serving a ten-year sentence in the Atlanta Penitentiary for speaking against the war. Wilson had refused to pardon him before leaving office. Daugherty met with Debs, and was deeply impressed. There was opposition from veterans, including the American Legion, and also from Florence Harding. The president did not feel he could release Debs until the war was officially over, but once the peace treaties were signed, commuted Debs's sentence on December 23, 1921. At Harding's request, Debs visited the president at the White House before going home to Indiana.

Harding released 23 other war opponents at the same time as Debs, and continued to review cases and release political prisoners throughout his presidency. Harding defended his prisoner releases as necessary to return the nation to normalcy.

==== Judicial appointments ====
Harding appointed four justices to the Supreme Court of the United States. When Chief Justice Edward Douglass White died in May 1921, Harding was unsure whether to appoint former president Taft or former Utah senator George Sutherland—he had promised seats on the court to both men. After briefly considering awaiting another vacancy and appointing them both, he chose Taft as Chief Justice. Sutherland was appointed to the court in 1922, to be followed by two other economic conservatives, Pierce Butler and Edward Terry Sanford, in 1923.

Harding also appointed six judges to the United States Courts of Appeals, 42 judges to the United States district courts, and two judges to the United States Court of Customs Appeals.

=== Political setbacks and western tour ===
Warren Harding on horse; State, War and Navy Building in background. Washington, D.C. LCCN2016890960

Entering the 1922 midterm congressional election campaign, Harding and the Republicans had followed through on many of their campaign promises. But some of the fulfilled pledges, like cutting taxes for the well-off, did not appeal to the electorate. The economy had not returned to normalcy, with unemployment at 11 percent, and organized labor angry over the outcome of the strikes. From 303 Republicans elected to the House in 1920, the new 68th Congress saw that party fall to a 221–213 majority. In the Senate, the Republicans lost eight seats, and had 51 of 96 senators in the new Congress, which Harding did not survive to meet.

A month after the election, the lame-duck session of the outgoing 67th Congress met. Harding then believed his early view of the presidency—that it should propose policies, but leave their adoption to Congress—was no longer enough, and he lobbied Congress, although in vain, to get his ship subsidy bill through. Once Congress left town in early March 1923, Harding's popularity began to recover. The economy was improving, and the programs of Harding's more able Cabinet members, such as Hughes, Mellon and Hoover, were showing results. Most Republicans realized that there was no practical alternative to supporting Harding in 1924 for his re-election campaign.

In the first half of 1923, Harding did two things that were later said to indicate foreknowledge of death: he sold the Star (though undertaking to remain as a contributing editor for ten years after his presidency), and he made a new will. Harding had long suffered occasional health problems, but when he was not experiencing symptoms, he tended to eat, drink and smoke too much. By 1919, he was aware he had a heart condition. Stress caused by the presidency and by Florence Harding's own chronic kidney condition debilitated him, and he never fully recovered from an episode of influenza in January 1923. After that, Harding, an avid golfer, had difficulty completing a round. In June 1923, Ohio Senator Willis met with Harding, but brought to the president's attention only two of the five items he intended to discuss. When asked why, Willis responded, "Warren seemed so tired."

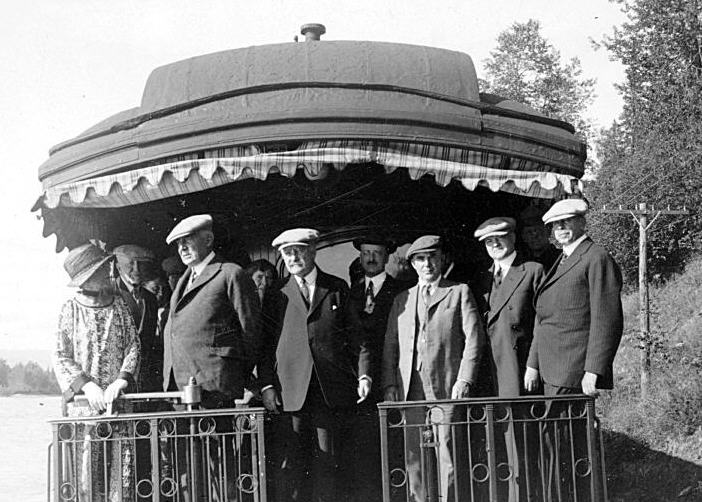
Harding aboard the presidential train in Alaska, July 1923, with Mrs. Harding and secretaries Hoover, Wallace, and Work

In early June 1923, Harding set out on a journey, which he dubbed the "Voyage of Understanding". The president planned to cross the country, go north to Alaska Territory, journey south along the West Coast, then travel by a U.S. Navy ship from San Diego along the Mexican and Central America West Coast, through the Panama Canal, to Puerto Rico, and return to Washington at the end of August. Harding loved to travel and had long contemplated a trip to Alaska. The trip would allow him to speak widely across the country, to politic and bloviate in advance of the 1924 campaign, and give him some rest away from Washington's oppressive summer heat.

Harding's political advisers had given him a physically demanding schedule, even though the president had ordered it cut back. In Kansas City, Harding spoke on transportation issues; in Hutchinson, Kansas, agriculture was the theme. In Denver, he spoke on his support of Prohibition, and continued west making a series of speeches not matched by any president until Franklin Roosevelt. Harding had become a supporter of the World Court, and wanted the U.S. to become a member. In addition to making speeches, he visited Yellowstone and Zion National Parks, and dedicated a monument on the Oregon Trail at a celebration organized by venerable pioneer Ezra Meeker and others.

On July 5, Harding embarked on USS Henderson in Washington state. He was the first president to visit Alaska, and spent hours watching the dramatic landscapes from the deck of the Henderson. After several stops along the coast, the presidential party left the ship at Seward to take the Alaska Railroad to McKinley Park and Fairbanks, where he addressed a crowd of 1,500 in 94 °F (34 °C) heat. The party was to return to Seward by the Richardson Trail, but due to Harding's fatigue, they went by train.

On July 26, 1923, Harding toured Vancouver, British Columbia as the first sitting American president to visit Canada. He was welcomed by the Lieutenant Governor of British Columbia Walter Nichol, Premier of British Columbia John Oliver, and the Mayor of Vancouver, and spoke to a crowd of over 50,000. Two years after his death, a memorial to Harding was unveiled in Stanley Park. Harding visited a golf course, but completed only six holes before becoming fatigued. After resting for an hour, he played the 17th and 18th holes so it would appear he had completed the round. He did not succeed in hiding his exhaustion; one reporter thought he looked so tired that a rest of mere days would be insufficient to refresh him.

In Seattle the next day, Harding kept up his busy schedule, giving a speech to 25,000 people at the stadium at the University of Washington. In the final speech he gave, Harding predicted statehood for Alaska. The president rushed through his speech, not waiting for applause from the audience.

== Death and state funeral ==
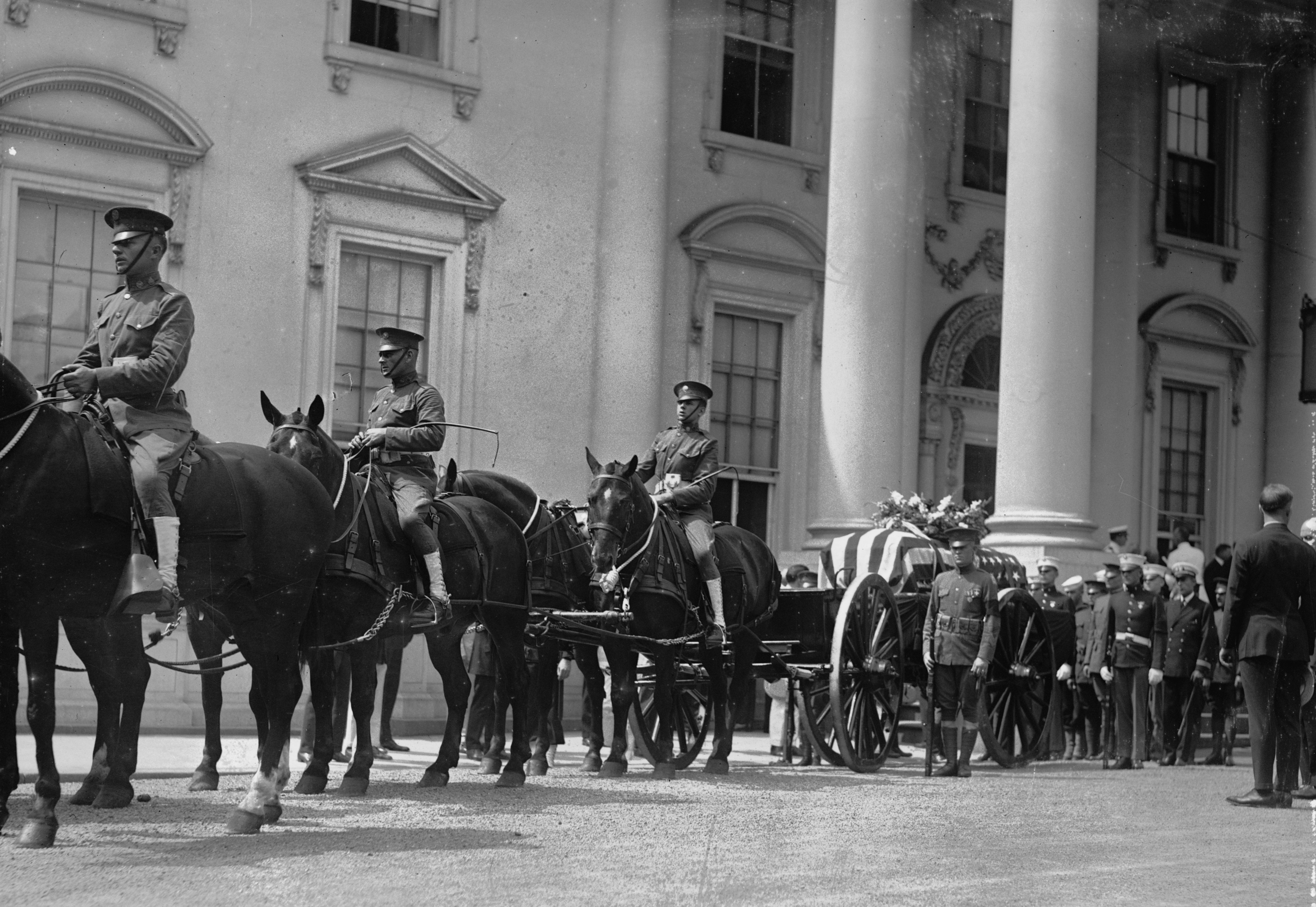
Harding's funeral procession passing the White House

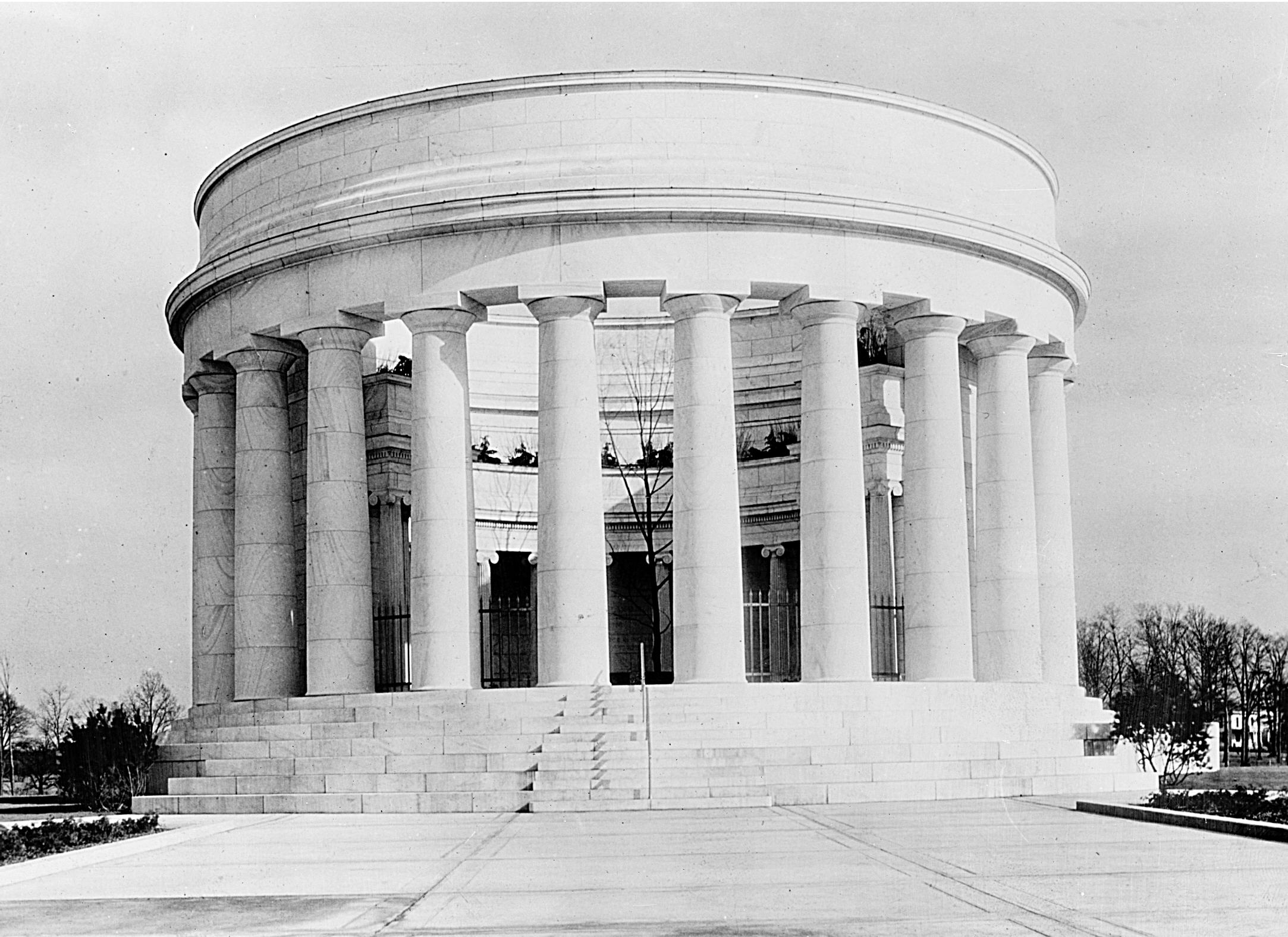
The Harding Tomb in Marion

Harding went to bed early the evening of July 27, 1923, a few hours after giving the speech at the University of Washington. Later that night, he called for his physician Charles E. Sawyer, complaining of pain in the upper abdomen. Sawyer thought that it was a recurrence of stomach upset, but Dr. Joel T. Boone suspected a heart problem. The press was told Harding had experienced an "acute gastrointestinal attack" and his scheduled weekend in Portland was cancelled. He felt better the next day, as the train rushed to San Francisco, where they arrived the morning of July 29. He insisted on walking from the train to the car, and was then rushed to the Palace Hotel, where he suffered a relapse. Doctors found that not only was his heart causing problems, but also that he had pneumonia, and he was confined to bed rest in his hotel room. Doctors treated him with liquid caffeine and digitalis, and he seemed to improve. Hoover released Harding's foreign policy address advocating membership in the World Court, and the president was pleased that it was favorably received. By the afternoon of August 2, Harding's condition still seemed to be improving and his doctors allowed him to sit up in bed. At around 7:30 that evening, Florence was reading to him "A Calm Review of a Calm Man", a flattering article about him from The Saturday Evening Post; she paused and he told her, "That's good. Go on, read some more." Those were to be his last words. She resumed reading when, a few seconds later, Harding twisted convulsively and collapsed back in the bed, gasping. Florence Harding immediately called the doctors into the room, but they were unable to revive him with stimulants. Harding was pronounced dead a few minutes later, at the age of 57. Harding's death was initially attributed to a cerebral hemorrhage, as doctors at the time did not generally understand the symptoms of cardiac arrest. Florence Harding did not consent to have the president autopsied.

Harding's unexpected death came as a great shock to the nation. He was liked and admired, both the press and public had followed his illness closely, and had been reassured by his apparent recovery. The suddenness of his death led to rumors that he either killed himself or was murdered. The suicide theory suggested that, as his administration's corruption was about to be discovered, Harding poisoned himself to avoid impeachment. Suspects named in murder theories included political opponents, political associates, his wife, and the doctors observing him.

Harding's body was carried in a casket to a train for a journey across the nation, which was followed closely in the newspapers. Nine million people lined the railroad tracks as the train carrying his body proceeded from San Francisco to Washington, D.C., where he lay in state at the United States Capitol rotunda. After funeral services there, Harding's body was transported to Marion, Ohio, for burial.

In Marion, Harding's body was placed on a horse-drawn hearse, which was followed by President Coolidge and Chief Justice Taft, then by Harding's widow and his father. They followed the hearse through the city, past the Star building and finally to the Marion Cemetery where the casket was placed in the cemetery's receiving vault. Funeral guests included inventor Thomas Edison and industrialist businessmen Henry Ford and Harvey Firestone. Warren Harding and Florence Harding, who died the following year, rest in the Harding Tomb, which was dedicated in 1931 by U.S. President Herbert Hoover.

== Scandals ==
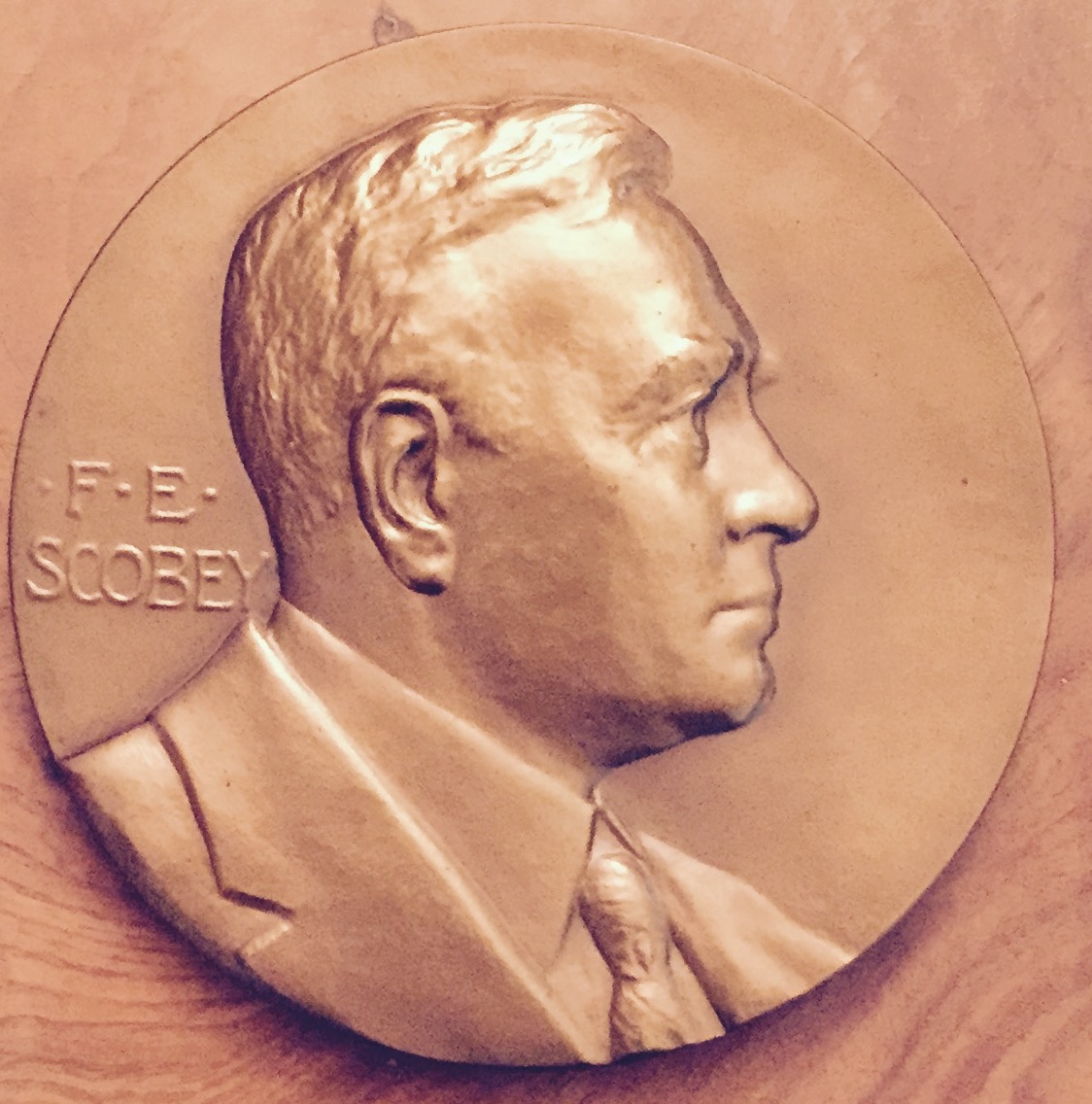
Harding made his friend, Frank E. Scobey, Director of the Mint. Medal by Chief Engraver George T. Morgan.

Harding appointed friends and acquaintances to federal positions. Some served competently, such as Charles E. Sawyer, the Hardings' personal physician from Marion who attended to them in the White House, and alerted Harding to the Veterans' Bureau scandal. Others proved ineffective in office, such as Daniel R. Crissinger, a Marion lawyer whom Harding made Comptroller of the Currency and later a governor of the Federal Reserve Board; another was Harding's old friend Frank Scobey, Director of the Mint, who Trani and Wilson noted "did little damage during his tenure." Still others of these associates proved corrupt and were later dubbed the "Ohio Gang".

Most of the scandals that have marred the reputation of Harding's administration did not emerge until after his death. The Veterans' Bureau scandal was known to Harding in January 1923 but, according to Trani and Wilson, "the president's handling of it did him little credit." Harding allowed the corrupt director of the bureau, Charles R. Forbes, to flee to Europe, though he later returned and served prison time. Harding had learned that Daugherty's factotum at the Justice Department, Jess Smith, was involved in corruption. The president ordered Daugherty to get Smith out of Washington and removed his name from the upcoming presidential trip to Alaska. Smith committed suicide on May 30, 1923. It is uncertain how much Harding knew about Smith's illicit activities. Murray noted that Harding was not involved in the corruption and did not condone it.

Hoover accompanied Harding on the Western trip and later wrote that Harding asked what Hoover would do if he knew of some great scandal, whether to publicize it or bury it. Hoover replied that Harding should publish and get credit for integrity, and asked for details. Harding said that it had to do with Smith but, when Hoover enquired as to Daugherty's possible involvement, Harding refused to answer.

=== Teapot Dome ===
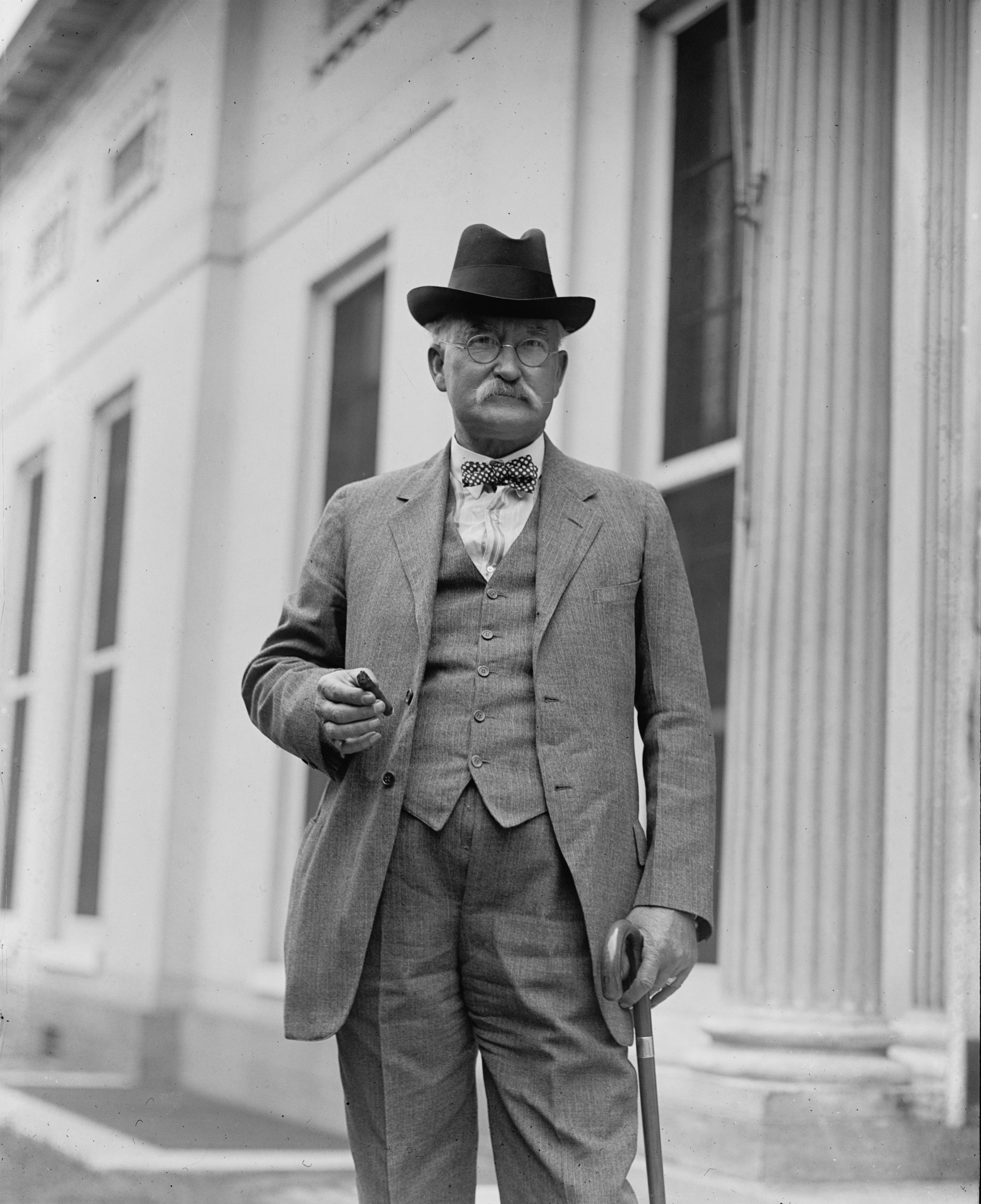
Albert B. Fall, Harding's first Secretary of the Interior, became the first former cabinet member to be sent to prison for crimes committed in office.

The scandal which has likely done the greatest damage to Harding's reputation is Teapot Dome. Like most of the administration's scandals, it came to light after Harding's death, and he was not aware of the illegal aspects. Teapot Dome involved an oil reserve in Wyoming which was one of three set aside for use by the Navy in a national emergency. There was a longstanding argument that the reserves should be developed; Wilson's first Interior Secretary Franklin Knight Lane was an advocate of this position. When the Harding administration took office, Interior Secretary Fall took up Lane's argument and Harding signed an executive order in May 1921 transferring the reserves from the Navy Department to Interior. This was done with the consent of Navy Secretary Edwin C. Denby.

The Interior Department announced in July 1921 that Edward Doheny had been awarded a lease to drill along the edges of the Elk Hills naval reserve in California. The announcement attracted little controversy, as the oil would have been lost to wells on adjacent private land. Wyoming Senator John Kendrick had heard from constituents that Teapot Dome had also been leased, but no announcement had been made. The Interior Department refused to provide documentation, so he secured the passage of a Senate resolution compelling disclosure. The department sent a copy of the Teapot Dome lease granting drilling rights to Harry Sinclair's Mammoth Oil Company, along with a statement that there had been no competitive bidding because military preparedness was involved—Mammoth was to build oil tanks for the Navy as part of the deal. This satisfied some people, but some conservationists, such as Gifford Pinchot, Harry A. Slattery, and others, pushed for a full investigation into Fall and his activities. They got Wisconsin Senator Robert M. La Follette to begin a Senate investigation into the oil leases. La Follette persuaded Democratic Montana Senator Thomas J. Walsh to lead the investigation, and Walsh read through the truckload of material provided by the Interior Department through 1922 into 1923. The documents included a letter from Harding stating that the transfer and leases had been with his knowledge and approval.

Hearings into Teapot Dome began in October 1923, two months after Harding's death. Fall had left office earlier that year, and he denied receiving any money from Sinclair or Doheny; Sinclair agreed. The following month, Walsh learned that Fall had spent lavishly on expanding and improving his New Mexico ranch. Fall reappeared and said that the money had come as a loan from Harding's friend and Washington Post publisher Edward B. McLean, but McLean denied it when he testified. Doheny told the committee that he had given Fall the money in cash as a personal loan out of regard for their past association, but Fall invoked his Fifth Amendment right against self-incrimination when he was compelled to appear again, rather than answer questions.

Investigators found that Fall and a relative had received a total of about $400,000 from Doheny and Sinclair, and that the transfers were contemporaneous with the controversial leases. Fall was convicted in 1929 of accepting bribes, and in 1931 became the first U.S. cabinet member to be imprisoned for crimes committed in office. Sinclair was convicted only of contempt of court for jury tampering. Doheny was brought to trial before a jury in April 1930 for giving the bribe that Fall had been convicted of accepting, but he was acquitted.

=== Justice Department ===
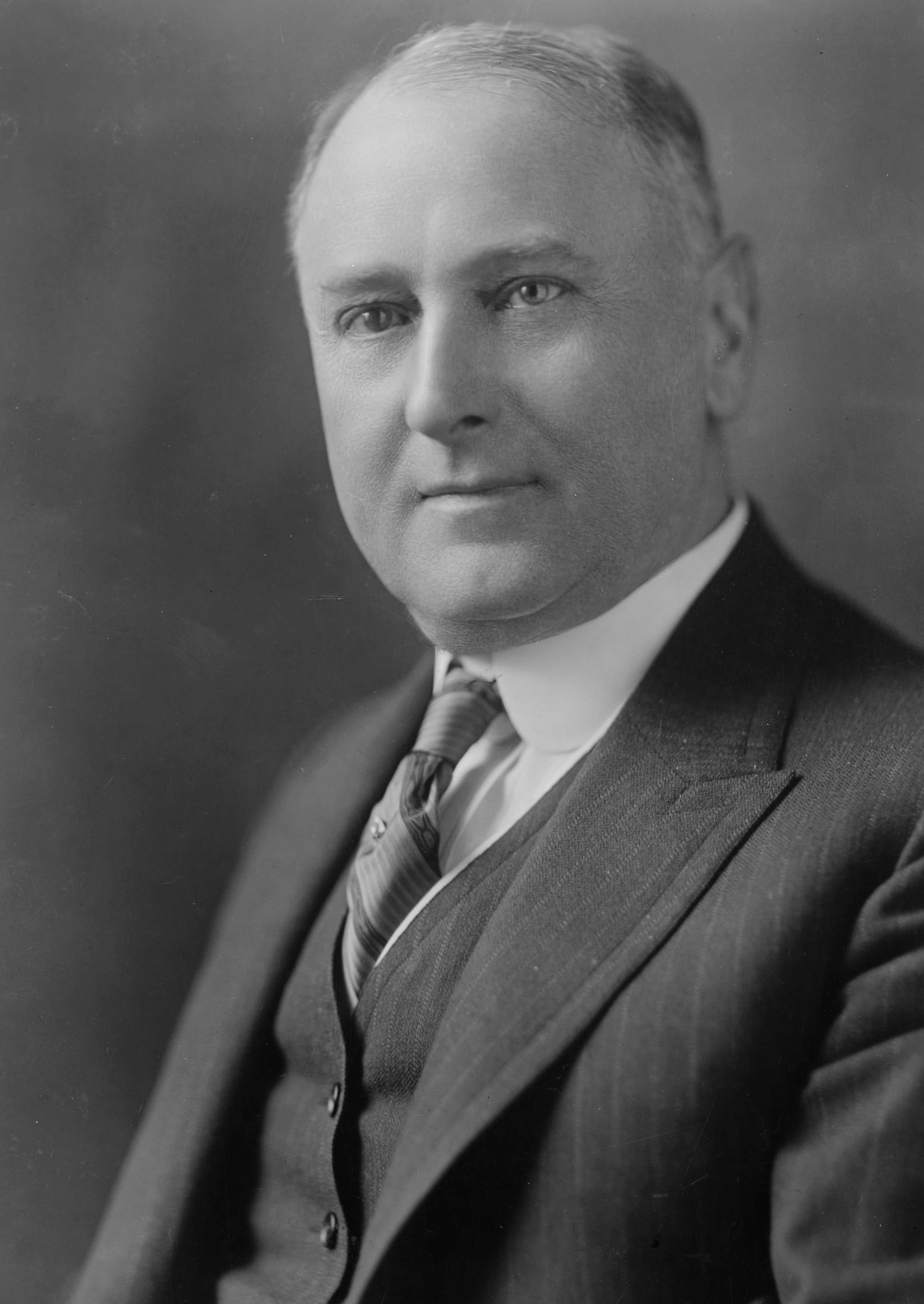
Harry M. Daugherty was implicated in the scandals but was never convicted of any offense.

Harding's appointment of Harry M. Daugherty as Attorney General received more criticism than any other. Daugherty's Ohio lobbying and back-room maneuvers were considered to disqualify him for his office. When details of the various scandals emerged in 1923 and 1924, Daugherty's many enemies were delighted at the prospect of connecting him with the dishonesty, and assumed he had taken part in Teapot Dome, though Fall and Daugherty were not friends. In February 1924, the Senate voted to investigate the Justice Department, where Daugherty remained Attorney General.

Democratic Montana Senator Burton K. Wheeler was on the investigating committee and assumed the role of prosecutor when hearings began on March 12, 1924. Jess Smith had engaged in influence peddling, conspiring with two other Ohioans, Howard Mannington and Fred A. Caskey, to accept payoffs from alcohol bootleggers to secure either immunity from prosecution or the release of liquor from government warehouses. Mannington and Caskey's residence became infamous as the Little Green House on K Street. Some witnesses, such as Smith's divorced wife Roxy Stinson, and corrupt former FBI agent Gaston Means, alleged that Daugherty was personally involved. Coolidge requested Daugherty's resignation when the Attorney General indicated that he would not allow Wheeler's committee access to Justice Department records, and Daugherty complied on March 28, 1924.

The illicit activity that caused Daugherty the most problems was a Smith deal with Colonel Thomas W. Miller, a former Delaware congressman, whom Harding had appointed Alien Property Custodian. Smith and Miller received a payoff of almost half a million dollars for getting a German-owned firm, the American Metal Company, released to new U.S. owners. Smith deposited $50,000 in a joint account with Daugherty, used for political purposes. Records relating to that account were destroyed by Daugherty and his brother. Miller and Daugherty were indicted for defrauding the government. The first trial, in September 1926, resulted in a hung jury; at the second, early in 1927, Miller was convicted and served prison time, but the jury again hung as to Daugherty. Though charges against Daugherty were then dropped, and he was never convicted of any offense, his refusal to take the stand in his own defense devastated what was left of his reputation. The former Attorney General remained defiant, blaming his troubles on his enemies in the labor movement and on the Communists, and wrote that he had "done nothing that prevents my looking the whole world in the face."

=== Veterans' Bureau ===
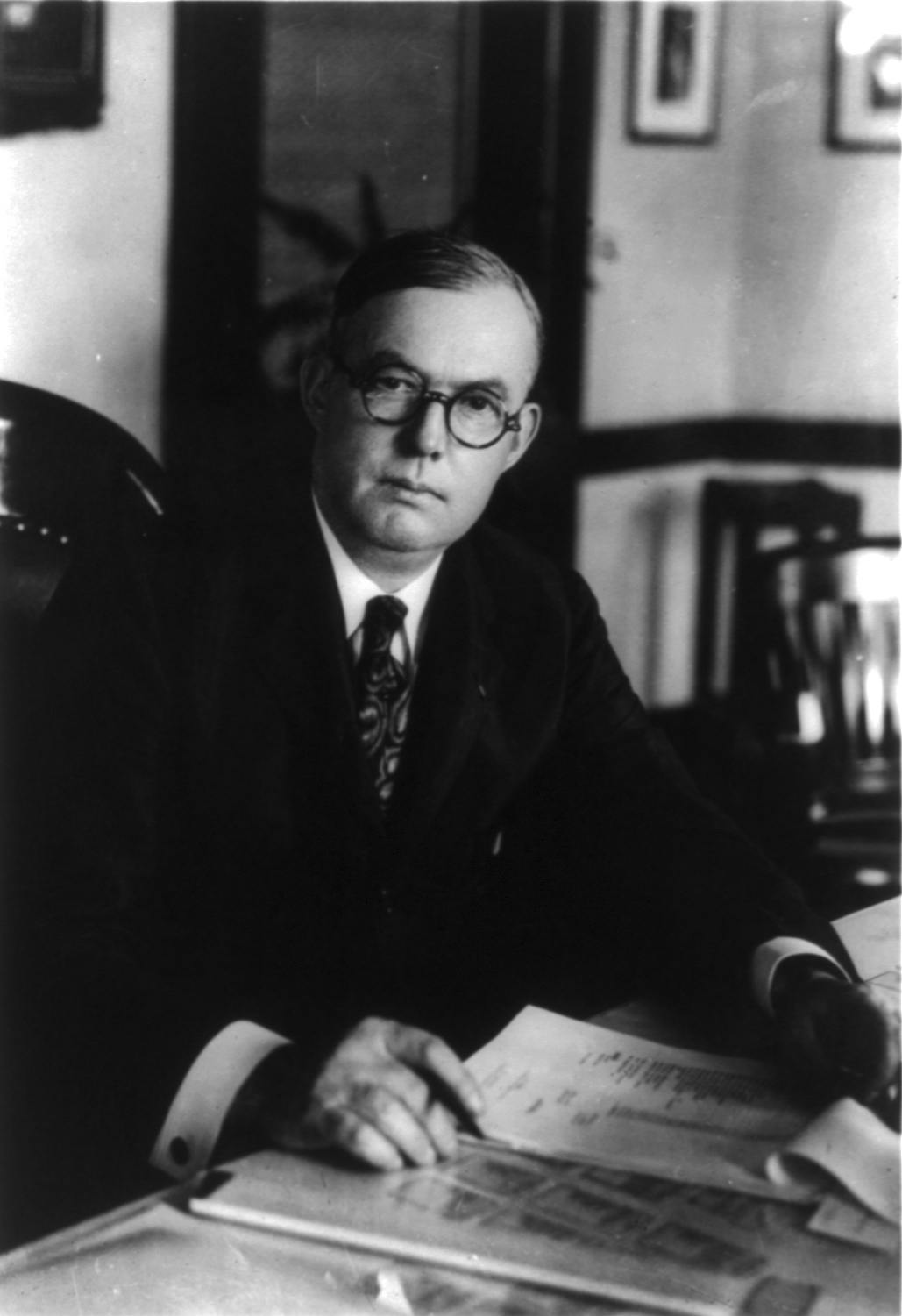
Charles R. Forbes, director of the Veterans' Bureau, who was sent to prison for defrauding the government

Charles R. Forbes, the energetic director of the Veterans' Bureau, sought to consolidate control of veterans' hospitals and their construction in his bureau. At the start of Harding's presidency, this power was vested in the Treasury Department. The politically powerful American Legion backed Forbes and denigrated those who opposed him, like Secretary Mellon, and in April 1922, Harding agreed to transfer control to the Veterans' Bureau. Forbes's main task was to ensure that new hospitals were built around the country to help the 300,000 wounded World War I veterans.

Near the beginning of 1922, Forbes had met Elias Mortimer, agent for the Thompson-Black Construction Company of St. Louis, which wanted to construct the hospitals. The two men became close, and Mortimer paid for Forbes's travels through the West, looking at potential hospital sites for the wounded World War I veterans. Forbes was also friendly with Charles F. Hurley, owner of the Hurley-Mason Construction Company of Washington state. Harding had ordered that all contracts be pursuant to public notice, but Forbes and the contractors worked out a deal whereby the two companies would get the contracts with the profits divided three ways. Some of the money went to the bureau's chief counsel, Charles F. Cramer. Forbes defrauded the government, increasing construction costs from $3,000 to $4,000 per bed. A tenth of the inflated construction billings were set aside for the conspirators, with Forbes receiving a third of the take. The graft then spread to land acquisition, with Forbes authorizing the purchase of a San Francisco tract worth less than $20,000 for $105,000. At least $25,000 of the resulting financial excess was divided between Forbes and Cramer.

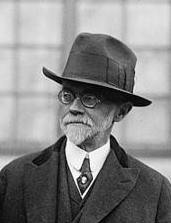
Charles E. Sawyer

Intent on making more money, Forbes in November 1922 began selling valuable hospital supplies warehoused under his control at the Perryville Depot in Maryland. The government had stockpiled huge quantities of hospital supplies during the first World War, which Forbes unloaded for a fraction of their cost to the Boston firm of Thompson and Kelly, at a time when the Veterans' Bureau was buying supplies for the hospitals at a much higher price.

The check on Forbes's authority at Perryville was Dr. Sawyer, Harding's physician and chairman of the Federal Hospitalization Board. Sawyer told Harding that Forbes was selling valuable hospital supplies to an insider contractor. At first Harding did not believe it, but Sawyer secured proof in January 1923. A shocked Harding, who alternated between rage and despondency over the corruption in his administration, summoned Forbes to the White House and demanded his resignation. Harding did not want an open scandal and allowed Forbes to flee to Europe, from where he resigned on February 15, 1923. In spite of Harding's efforts, gossip about Forbes's activities resulted in the Senate ordering an investigation two weeks later, and in mid-March, Cramer committed suicide.

Mortimer was willing to tell all, as Forbes had been in an affair with his wife, which also broke up the Forbeses' marriage. The construction executive was the star witness at the hearings in late 1923, after Harding's death. Forbes returned from Europe to testify, but convinced few, and in 1924, he and John W. Thompson, of Thompson–Black, were tried in Chicago for conspiracy to defraud the government. Both were convicted and sentenced to two years in prison. Forbes began to serve his sentence in 1926; Thompson, who had a bad heart, died that year before commencing his. According to Trani and Wilson, "One of the most troublesome aspects of the Harding presidency was that he appeared to be far more concerned with political liabilities of a scandal than in securing justice."

== Extramarital affairs ==
External videos
- Panel discussion at the Library of Congress on the love letters of Warren G. Harding, July 22, 2014, C-SPAN

Harding had an extramarital affair with Carrie Fulton Phillips of Marion, which lasted about 15 years before ending in 1920. The affair was revealed when Harding biographer Francis Russell, while researching his book in 1963, discovered letters from Harding to Phillips. The letters were donated to the Ohio Historical Society, and some there wanted the letters destroyed to preserve what remained of Harding's reputation. A lawsuit ensued, with Harding's heirs claiming copyright over the letters. The case was ultimately settled in 1971, with the letters donated to the Library of Congress. They were sealed until 2014, but before their opening, historians used copies at the Western Reserve Historical Society (Kenneth W. Duckett Papers) and in Russell's papers at the University of Wyoming. Russell concluded from the letters that Phillips was the love of Harding's life—"the enticements of his mind and body combined in one person," but historian Justin P. Coffey in his 2014 review of Harding biographies criticizes him for "obsess[ing] over Harding's sex life."

Harding fathered Elizabeth Ann Blaesing out of wedlock with his mistress Nan Britton. In 2015, DNA testing proved Blaesing was his daughter. Harding had vigorously denied paternity. According to family lore, he was infertile and could not have fathered a child, having suffered from mumps in childhood, and his siblings, nieces, and nephews maintained this position for 90 years.

In 1927, Britton, who was also from Marion, published The President's Daughter, writing that Harding had fathered her child Elizabeth Ann Blaesing. The book, which was dedicated to "all unwedded mothers" and "their innocent children whose fathers are usually not known to the world", was sold, like pornography, door-to-door, wrapped in brown paper. Harding's reputation had deteriorated since his death in 1923, and many believed Britton. The public was tantalized by salacious details such as Britton's claim that the two had sex in a closet near the Oval Office, with Secret Service agents posted to ward off intruders.

Despite being widely believed, Britton lost a libel lawsuit against a rebuttal of her book. She said that Harding had provided child support of $500 per month for the daughter he never met, but that she had destroyed romantic correspondence from him at his request. Writing before Britton's claim was verified, Russell believed it unquestioningly, while Dean, having reviewed Britton's papers at University of California, Los Angeles (UCLA), regarded it as unproven. Sinclair suggested that a harsher standard was applied to Harding than to Grover Cleveland, who was elected president in 1884 even though it was known that he had a mistress and might have fathered a child out of wedlock.

== Historical views ==
Upon his death, Harding was deeply mourned—not only in the United States, but around the world. He was called a man of peace in many European newspapers. American journalists praised him lavishly, with some describing him as having given his life for his country. His associates were stunned by his demise. Daugherty wrote, "I can hardly write about it or allow myself to think about it yet." Hughes stated, "I cannot realize that our beloved Chief is no longer with us."

Hagiographic accounts of Harding's life quickly followed his death, such as Joe Mitchell Chapple's Life and Times of Warren G. Harding, Our After-War President (1924). By then, the scandals were breaking, and the Harding administration soon became a byword for corruption in the view of the public. Works written in the late 1920s helped shape Harding's dubious historical reputation: Masks in a Pageant, by William Allen White, mocked and dismissed Harding, as did Samuel Hopkins Adams' fictionalized account of the Harding administration, Revelry. These books depicted Harding's time in office as one of great presidential weakness. The publication of Nan Britton's bestselling book disclosing they had had an affair also lowered the late president in public esteem. President Coolidge, wishing to distance himself from his predecessor, refused to dedicate the Harding Tomb. Hoover, Coolidge's successor, was similarly reluctant, but eventually presided over the dedication in 1931 with Coolidge in attendance. By that time, with the Great Depression in full swing, Hoover was nearly as discredited as Harding.

Adams continued to shape the negative view of Harding with several nonfiction works in the 1930s, culminating with The Incredible Era: The Life and Times of Warren G. Harding (1939) in which he called his subject "an amiable, well-meaning third-rate Mr. Babbitt, with the equipment of a small-town semi-educated journalist ... It could not work. It did not work."

Dean views the works of White and Adams as "remarkably unbalanced and unfair accounts, exaggerating the negative, assigning responsibility to Harding for all wrongs, and denying him credit for anything done right. Today there is considerable evidence refuting their portrayals of Harding. Yet the myth has persisted."

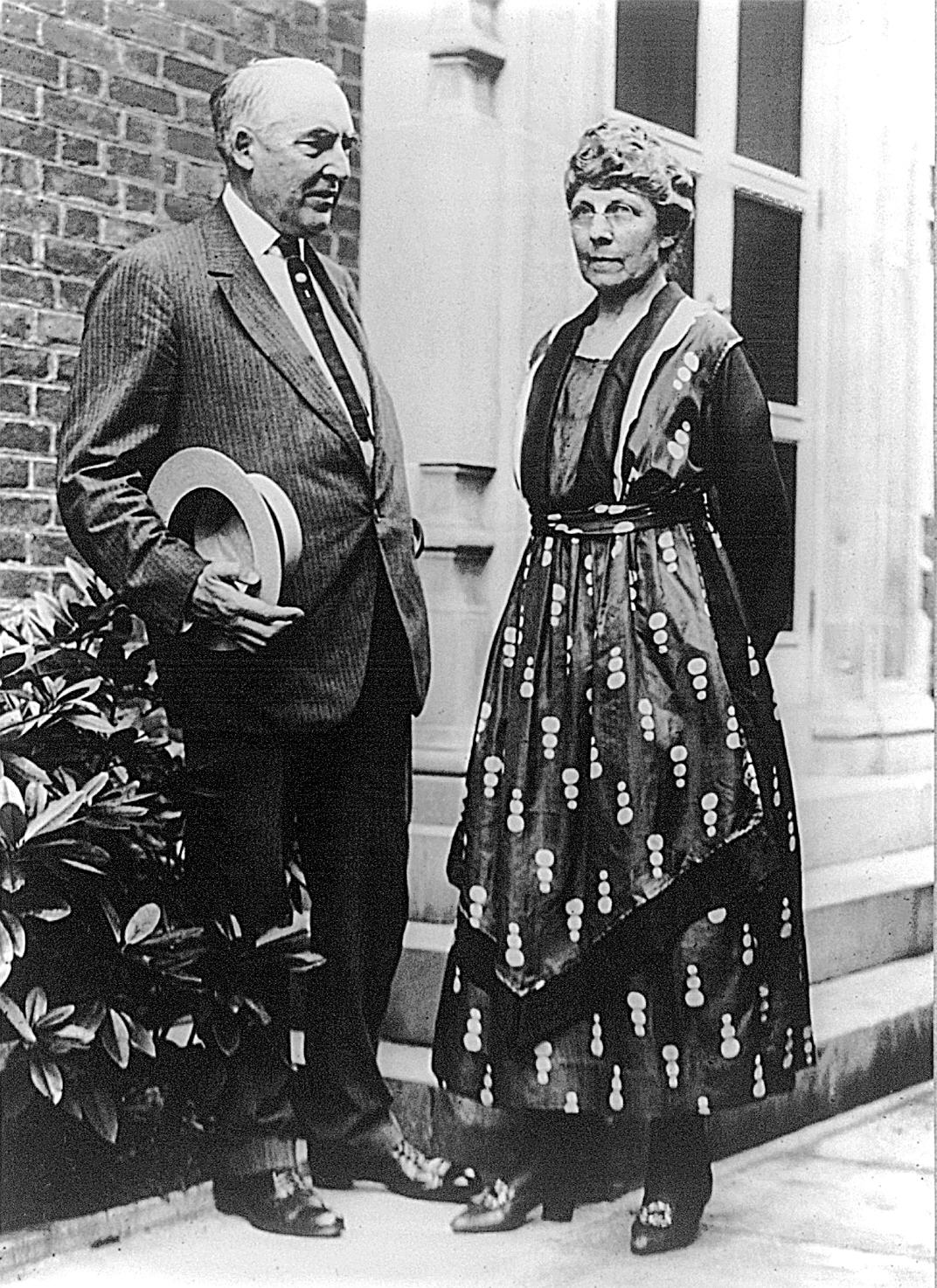
Warren and Florence Harding, c. 1922. Florence was highly protective of her husband's legacy.

The opening of Harding's papers for research in 1964 sparked a small spate of biographies, of which the most controversial was Russell's The Shadow of Blooming Grove (1968), which concluded that the rumors of black ancestry (the "shadow" of the title) deeply affected Harding in his formative years, causing both Harding's conservatism and his desire to get along with everyone. Coffey faults Russell's methods, and deems the biography "largely critical, though not entirely unsympathetic." Murray's The Harding Era (1969) took a more positive view of the president, and put him in the context of his times. Trani and Wilson faulted Murray for "a tendency to go overboard" in trying to connect Harding with the successful policies of his cabinet officers, and for asserting, without sufficient evidence, that a new, more assertive Harding had emerged by 1923.

Later decades saw revisionist books published on Harding. Robert Ferrell's The Strange Deaths of President Harding (1996), according to Coffey, "spends almost the entire work challenging every story about Harding and concludes that almost everything that is read and taught about his subject is wrong." In 2004, John Dean, noted for his involvement in another presidential scandal, Watergate, wrote the Harding volume in "The American Presidents" series of short biographies, edited by Arthur M. Schlesinger Jr. Coffey considered that book the most revisionist to date, and faults Dean for glossing over some unfavorable episodes in Harding's life, like his silence during the 1914 Senate campaign, when his opponent Hogan was being attacked for his faith.

External videos
- Booknotes interview with Robert Ferrell on The Strange Deaths of President Harding, January 12, 1997, C-SPAN
- Booknotes interview with John Dean on Warren G. Harding, March 14, 2004, C-SPAN

Trani faults Harding's own lack of depth and decisiveness as bringing about his tarnished legacy.

Harding has traditionally been ranked as one of the worst presidents. In a 1948 poll conducted by Harvard University, historian Arthur M. Schlesinger Sr. conducted a survey of scholars' opinions of the presidents, ranking Harding last among the 29 presidents considered. He has also been last in many other polls since then.

Ferrell attributes Harding's negative ratings to scholars who read little that is substantive, and who focus more on sensational accounts of Harding. Coffey believes "the academic lack of interest in Harding has cost him his reputation, as scholars still rank Harding as nearly dead last among presidents."

=== Reassessment ===
In historical rankings of the U.S. presidents during the decades after his term in office, Harding was often rated among the worst. But in the 2010s, some authors and historians began to reassess Harding's record in office. In The Spoils of War (2016), Bruce Bueno de Mesquita and Alastair Smith place Harding first in a combined ranking of fewest wartime deaths and highest annual per capita income growth during each president's time in office.

Murray argued in his book The Harding Era that Harding deserves more credit than historians have given: "He was certainly the equal of a Franklin Pierce, an Andrew Johnson, a Benjamin Harrison, or even a Calvin Coolidge. In concrete accomplishments, his administration was superior to a sizable portion of those in the nation's history."

Murray notes some general points regarding Harding's poor standing which illustrate the relatively obscure and weak basis for negative critiques of Harding in general. Namely, the conventional views often entail omission of an actual critique or analysis of Harding's actions, and often consist of a relatively limited and arbitrary focus on the nature of Harding's appointees, to the omission and detriment of a broader analysis of larger historical facts. Murray states:

In the American system, there is no such thing as an innocent bystander in the White House. If Harding can rightly claim the achievements of a Hughes in State or a Hoover in Commerce, he must also shoulder responsibility for a Daugherty in Justice and a Fall in Interior. Especially must he bear the onus of his lack of punitive action against such men as Forbes and Smith. By his inaction, he forfeited whatever chance he had to maintain the integrity of his position and salvage a favorable image for himself and his administration. As it was, the subsequent popular and scholarly negative verdict was inevitable, if not wholly deserved.

== See also ==
- Cultural depictions of Warren G. Harding
- Harding Home
- Laddie Boy, Harding's dog
- List of memorials to Warren G. Harding
- List of people on the cover of Time Magazine: 1920s: March 10, 1923
- List of presidents of the United States
- List of presidents of the United States by previous experience
- List of presidents of the United States who died in office
- Presidents of the United States on U.S. postage stamps
- Warren G. Harding Presidential Center

== Bibliography ==
- Adams, Samuel Hopkins (1939). The Incredible Era: The Life and Times of Warren Gamaliel Harding. Boston: Houghton Mifflin. (1979 Octagon Books edition ISBN 0-374-90051-5.)
- Bagby, Wesley M. (March 1955). "The 'Smoke Filled Room' and the Nomination of Warren G. Harding". The Mississippi Valley Historical Review. 41 (4): 657–674. doi:10.2307/1889182. ISSN 0161-391X. JSTOR 1889182.
- Coffey, Justin P. (2014), "Harding Biographies", in Sibley, Katherine A. S. (ed.), A Companion to Warren G. Harding, Calvin Coolidge, and Herbert Hoover, Chichester, UK: John Wiley & Sons, Inc., pp. 79–93, ISBN 978-1-4443-5003-6
- Dary, David (2004). The Oregon Trail: An American Saga. New York: Alfred A. Knopf. ISBN 978-0-375-41399-5.
- Dean, John W. (2004). Warren Harding (Kindle ed.). New York: Henry Holt and Co. ISBN 978-0-8050-6956-3.
- Downes, Randolph C. (1970). The Rise of Warren Gamaliel Harding, 1865–1920. Columbus, OH: Ohio University Press. ISBN 978-0-8142-0140-4.
- Felzenberg, Alvin S. (2010). The Leaders We Deserved (and a Few We Didn't): Rethinking the Presidential Rating Game. New York: Basic Books. ISBN 978-0-4650-1890-1.
- Ferrell, Robert H. (1996). The Strange Deaths of President Harding (Kindle ed.). Columbia, MO: University of Missouri Press. ISBN 978-0-8262-1202-3.
- Morello, John A. (2001). Selling the President, 1920: Albert D. Lasker, Advertising, and the Election of Warren G. Harding. Westport, CT: Praeger. ISBN 978-0-275-97030-7.
- Murray, Robert K. (1969). The Harding Era 1921–1923: Warren G. Harding and his Administration. Minneapolis: University of Minnesota Press. ISBN 978-0-8166-0541-5.
- Murray, Robert K. (1973). The Politics of Normalcy: Governmental Theory and Practice in the Harding–Coolidge Era. New York: W. W. Norton & Company. ISBN 978-0-393-05474-3.
- Nevins, Allan (1932). Dictionary of American Biography: Harding, Warren Gamaliel. New York: Charles Scribner's Sons. pp. 252–257. OCLC 4171403.
- Noggle, Burl (September 1957). "The Origins of the Teapot Dome Investigation". The Mississippi Valley Historical Review. 44 (2). Organization of American Historians: 237–266. doi:10.2307/1887189. JSTOR 1887189.
- Payne, Phillip G. (2014), "The Harding Presidency: Scandals, Legacy, and Memory", in Sibley, Katherine A. S. (ed.), A Companion to Warren G. Harding, Calvin Coolidge, and Herbert Hoover, Chichester, UK: John Wiley & Sons, Inc., pp. 79–93, ISBN 978-1-4443-5003-6
- Russell, Francis (1968). The Shadow of Blooming Grove: Warren G. Harding In His Times. Norwalk, CT: Easton Press. ISBN 0-07-054338-0.
- Schlesinger, Arthur M. Jr. (1957). The Age of Roosevelt: The Crisis of the Old Order, 1919–1933. London: Heinemann. ISBN 978-0-618-34085-9.
- Sibley, Katherine A. S. (2009). First Lady Florence Harding: Behind the Tragedy and Controversy. Lawrence, KS: University Press of Kansas. ISBN 978-0-7006-1649-7.
- Sinclair, Andrew (1969) [1965]. The Available Man: The Life behind the Masks of Warren Gamaliel Harding (1st Quadrangle Paperback ed.). Chicago: Quadrangle Books. OCLC 422550801.
- Sullivan, Mark. Our Times: 1900-1925: Volume 6: The Twenties (1935) pp. 16–371. online, by a leading journalist.
- Trani, Eugene P.; Wilson, David L. (1977). The Presidency of Warren G. Harding. American Presidency. Lawrence, KS: The Regents Press of Kansas. ISBN 978-0-7006-0152-3.
- Walters, Everett (1948). Joseph Benson Foraker: An Uncompromising Republican. The Ohio History Press. OCLC 477641.
- Walters, Ryan S. The Jazz Age President: Defending Warren G. Harding (2022) excerpt also online review
- Wynn, Neil (1986). From Progressivism to Prosperity: World War I and American Society. New York: Holmes & Meier. ISBN 978-0-8419-1107-9.

Political offices
Preceded by Woodrow Wilson	President of the United States; 1921–1923	Succeeded by Calvin Coolidge
Preceded by Theodore E. Burton	United States Senator (Class 3) from Ohio; 1915–1921	Succeeded by Frank B. Willis
Preceded by Harry Gordon	Lieutenant Governor of Ohio; 1904–1906	Succeeded by Andrew Harris
Party political offices
Preceded by Andrew L. Harris	Republican nominee for Governor of Ohio; 1910	Succeeded by Robert B. Brown
First	Republican nominee for U.S. Senator from Ohio (Class 3); 1914	Succeeded by Frank B. Willis
Vacant Title last held by John R. Lynch	Keynote Speaker of the Republican National Convention; 1916	Succeeded by Henry Cabot Lodge
Preceded by Charles Hughes	Republican nominee for President of the United States; 1920	Succeeded by Calvin Coolidge
U.S. Senate
Preceded by Theodore Burton	United States Senator (Class 3) from Ohio; 1915–1921; Served alongside: Atlee Pomerene	Succeeded by Frank Willis
Honorary titles
Preceded by Unknown Soldier of World War I	People who have lain in state or honor in the United States Capitol rotunda 1923	Succeeded by William Howard Taft
