= Closeted =

LGBTQ people who have not disclosed their sexual orientation or gender identity

Closeted and in the closet are metaphors for LGBTQ people who have not disclosed their sexual orientation or gender identity and aspects thereof, including sexual identity and sexual behavior. This metaphor is associated and sometimes combined with coming out, the act of revealing one's sexuality or gender to others, to create the phrase "coming out of the closet".

Some reasons why LGBTQ people stay closeted include discrimination, fear for one's safety, internalized homophobia or transphobia, or living in a hostile environment.

== Etymology ==
Nondisclosure of one's sexual orientation or gender identity preceded the use of "closet" as a term for the act. For example, the writer Thomas Mann entered a heterosexual marriage with a woman in 1905, and had six children, but discussed his attraction to men in his private diary, which by contemporary terms would have designated him a closeted homosexual man.

D. Travers Scott claims that the phrase "coming out of the closet", along with its derivative meanings of "coming out" and "closeted", has its origins in two different metaphors. "Coming out" was first a phrase used in the early 20th century in reference to a young woman attending a debutante ball, such that she was "coming out" into society. In past times, the word "closet" meant "bedroom", so one's sexuality was not shown beyond there. Later in the 1960s, the metaphor of a "skeleton in the closet", which meant to hide a secret due to taboos or social stigmas, was also used in reference to a gender identity or sexuality that one may not wish to disclose. As such, to reveal one's LGBTQ+ identity that was previously hidden or kept secret was to allow a skeleton to come out of the closet.

One linguistic study suggests that the transgender community may use different vocabulary to refer to the disclosure status of one's gender identity, such as "stealth" in place of "closeted".

== Background ==
A 2019 study by the Yale School of Public Health estimated that 83% of LGBT people around the world do not reveal their sexual orientation.

The closet is difficult for a non-heterosexual, non-cisgender identified person to fully come "out" of, whether or not that person desires to do so. Scholar Eve Kosofsky Sedgwick, author of the Epistemology of the Closet, discusses the difficulty with the closet:

...the deadly elasticity of heterosexist presumption means that, like Wendy in Peter Pan, people find new walls springing up around them even as they drowse: every encounter with a new classful of students, to say nothing of a new boss, social worker, loan officer, landlord, doctor, erects new closets.

Professor Mary Lou Rasmussen says that there exists a "coming out imperative", where the dominant LGBTQ+ narrative offers no moral alternative to coming out, relegating the closet to "a zone of shame and exclusion". This may suggest that in the modern day, there is pressure or an expectation for an LGBTQ+ person to come out of the closet. Rasmussen further notes that there are several factors that may dictate someone's choice to remain closeted, such as ethnic or religious background, or financial dependence on family or peers that may be jeopardized if that person chooses to come out.

Scholars also noted that people of different genders and sexual orientations often faced different experiences and stigmas, resulting in varied rates of being closeted among LGBTQ+ people of different identities. One 2015 study found that bisexual men were more often closeted than gay men, due to the possibility of negative reactions from heterosexual partners, in addition to homophobia.

A study by Lal Zimman noted that among transgender people, coming before and after taking up their corresponding gender role is separated into distinct categories of "declaration" and "disclosure". Before occupying a different gender role, the act of coming out of the closet is one where a person declares a different gender identity than what they are perceived as. After taking up the gender role, this person is disclosing that they had previously identified with and fulfilled a different one. Zimman found that declaration of one's gender identity happened more often than disclosure of a past gender role.

== Africa ==
A 2019 study of LGBTQIA+ individuals found that 94.8% were closeted in North Africa and 89.5% were closeted in Sub-Saharan Africa.

== Asia ==
=== China ===
A 2016 survey found that 85% of LGBT people have not told anyone about their sexual orientation and 95% have not revealed it outside their family. A study in 2015 described homosexuality as "not socially accepted in China", noting that gay Chinese men may participate in lavender marriages with heterosexual or lesbian women, and that nondisclosure of sexuality may stem from opposition from a heterosexual spouse in addition to societal stigmas against homosexuality.

=== Japan ===
Some scholars and activists consider the process of coming out in Japan to be extremely difficult, claiming that due to the cultural and emotional importance of the home, the emotional honesty expressed within a household may create a "locus of homophobia" that would reinforce one's desire to remain closeted. Overall, a study in 2017 found that among members of the Japanese LGBTQ+ community, coming out of the closet was generally considered desirable, but the process may be complicated by patriarchal or heteronormative ideals held by society.

=== Taiwan ===
Frank T. Y. Wang argues that among gay or bisexual Taiwanese men, the societal importance of a family or household unit is the primary reason why one may choose to remain closeted. Participants of the study often cited their family's conservatism, fear of disappointment or emotional distress, or a desire to keep their parents from the stigma of having an LGBTQ+ family member as reasons for staying closeted. Wang also notes that unmarried men in Taiwan tended to live with their parents, such that older closeted men may arouse suspicion for not having married, causing them to compensate by emotionally or spatially distancing themselves from the household, or otherwise act in certain ways to raise or lower the expectations one's family may have for them.

== Europe ==
According to a 2020 survey by the European Union Agency for Fundamental Rights, 30% of LGBT people in the EU are very rarely or almost never open; the highest percentages are Lithuania (60%), Bulgaria (54%) and Romania and Serbia (both 53%).

== Middle East ==
The majority of Middle Eastern countries have very harsh laws against LGBT rights, with some even executing gay men. A 2019 study found that 94.8% of LGBT individuals in the Middle East were closeted.

== North America ==
Some scholars criticize that coming out of the closet in North America is at times associated with migration from a rural, conservative area to a progressive urban one. Lewis argues that queer migration is not usually an escape from intolerance of LGBTQ+ identities, but instead driven by a desire to escape shifts in previous social networks and relationships that had occurred after coming out.

=== United States ===
In the United States, a 2019 report stated that 4% of gay and lesbian people and 26% of bisexual people are not "out" to any of the important people in their lives. A 2018 report by the Human Rights Campaign found that 46% of LGBT American workers are closeted at their workplace.

In late-20th-century America, the closet had become a central metaphor for grasping the history and social dynamics of gay life, along with the concept of coming out. The closet narrative set up an implicit dualism between being "in" or being "out." Those who were "in" are often stigmatized as living false unhappy lives. However, there are numerous social, economic, familial, and personal repercussions that may lead to someone remaining, whether consciously or unconsciously, "in" the closet. For example, the Lavender Scare led to the implementation of Executive Order 10450 in 1953, which banned all gays and lesbians from working in the US federal government, forcing employees who wished to retain their jobs to remain closeted. Sometimes, people have remained in the closet because they themselves have had difficulty understanding or accepting their sexuality. The decision to come out or remain in the closet is considered a deeply-personal one, and outing remains controversial in today's culture.

In the 21st century, the related concept of a "glass closet" emerged in LGBT discourse. The term describes public figures, such as entertainers or politicians, who are out of the closet in their personal lives and do not engage in the tactics (such as entering a lavender marriage or publicly dating a person of the opposite sex) that were historically used by members of the LGBTQ+ community to hide their gender or sexuality, but have not formally disclosed their sexual orientation to the public. Lavender marriages had occurred throughout Hollywood to advance and maintain one's career and since the early 20th century. Examples of celebrities who were in the glass closet include Colton Haynes and Ricky Martin. Closeting is seen not only in celebrities but also in the media that is produced. Popular television shows use metaphors to show closeting that differ based on how they relate to society at a given time.

Recent attention to bullying of LGBTQ youth and teens in the United States also gives an indication that many youth and teens remain closeted throughout their educational years and beyond for fear of disapproval from parents, friends, teachers and community members. To remain in the closet offers an individual a layer of protection against ridicule and bullying; however, to remain in the closet typically takes a toll on the mental health of the individual, especially in the adolescent years as reflected in suicide rates among LGBTQ youths. Being closeted can also have different effects on the mental health on men and women. In a study done by John E. Pachankis from Yale University and Susan D. Cochran and Vickie M. Mays from the University of California, it was found that women who were closeted were twice as likely to report depressive episodes than women who were out. Comparatively it was found that men who were in the closet were less likely to report a depressive episode than those out of the closet. Along with effects on the mental and physical health of those who remain in the closet, it also impacts the cost of health care and the public awareness of the LGBTQ community.

However, Seidman, Meeks and Traschen (1999) argue that "the closet" may be becoming an antiquated metaphor in the lives of modern-day Americans for two reasons.

1. Homosexuality is becoming increasingly normalized and the shame and secrecy often associated with it appear to be in decline.
2. The metaphor of the closet hinges upon the notion that stigma management is a way of life. However, stigma management may actually be increasingly done situationally.

== South America ==
A 2019 study found that 35.4% of LGB individuals in Latin America were closeted.

== Re-closeting ==
African queer media website DNB Stories Africa has outlined how some black LGBTQ+ elders in Nigeria and the United Kingdom are "forced to hide their sexual orientation or gender identity again after years of living openly," referring to this as "re‑closeting." Re-closeting most often occurs in residential care settings (for example nursing homes and assisted‑living facilities) in order to "avoid discrimination, neglect, or hostility from staff, other residents, or relatives." It is especially prevalent in care settings where caregivers have not been trained in LGBTQ+ cultural sensitivity.

The charity Stonewall in the United Kingdom has undertaken research that indicates that many LGBTQ+ elders lack trust in care systems and worry that revealing their identity will lead to poorer treatment. Michael Adams, chief executive officer of the LGBTQ senior advocacy group SAGE, has said that "Re-closeting looks like: People taking the pictures of their loved ones and their partners down off their walls because they're afraid a homecare attendant will see the pictures and will mistreat them as a result of it."

Re-closeting can be distressing and significantly impact individuals' mental health.

== In media ==
=== Books ===
- Dr. Matthew O'Connor, a gay character in the 1936 novel Nightwood by Djuna Barnes, refers to himself as "[...] I, the Old Woman who lives in the closet," (138).
- Elliot Weiner, narrator of Robert Plunket's 1983 novel My Search for Warren Harding is in the closet. His relationship with women, and his own obliviousness to his orientation are played for humour throughout the book.
- The short story Brokeback Mountain and its 2005 film adaptation directed by Ang Lee center on two men who briefly enter a homosexual relationship, but proceed to enter heterosexual relationships and conceal their homosexuality from their peers.
- "Devotion", a short story by Adam Haslett, concerns a closeted gay man and his sister who both harbor feelings for the same man.
- The 2015 novel Simon vs. the Homo Sapiens Agenda and its film adaptation Love, Simon (2018) center on a closeted teenage boy who faces the prospect of coming out.

=== Films and television ===
- Lan Yu (2001) is a Hong Kong-Chinese film where the protagonist enters a relationship with a closeted businessman.
- The L Word (2004–2009), an American-Canadian television drama series following the lives of a group of lesbian and bisexual women who live in West Hollywood, featured characters including Dana Fairbanks, a closeted professional tennis player, and Nikki Stevens, a closeted gay actress.
- Hollywood (2020) is an American drama streaming television miniseries which features Richard "Dick" Samuels, a studio executive who is a closeted gay man.
- Hunters (2020–2023) is an American conspiracy drama thriller television series and features Millie Morris, a closeted lesbian FBI agent and her girlfriend Maria De La Ruiz.
- Overcompensating (2025) is a Prime Video original created by Benito Skinner that follows a closeted man trying to accept his sexuality in college.
- Heated Rivalry (2025) is a Canadian sports romance television series based on Game Changers book series by Rachel Reid. It stars Hudson Williams as Shane Hollander and Connor Storrie as Ilya Rozanov, two closeted professional hockey players who maintain a secret long-term romantic relationship while playing for rival teams and navigating concealment to protect their careers.
- Maspalomas (2025), a Spanish Basque-language film. After experiencing a carefree living in Maspalomas as an openly gay man, 76-year-old Vicente needs to return to San Sebastián after a stroke, reuniting with his daughter (whom he abandoned years prior), being forced to join a conservative nursing home. The new context leads Vicente to choose to go back into the closet.

== Sources ==
- Chauncey, George (1994). Gay New York: Gender, Urban Culture, and the Making of the Gay Male World, 1890–1940. New York: Basic Books. Cited in Seidman 2003.
- Humphreys, L. (1970). Tearoom Trade: Impersonal Sex in Public Places. Chicago: Aldine.
- Kennedy, Elizabeth. "'But We Would Never Talk about It': The Structure of Lesbian Discretion in South Dakota, 1928-1933" in Inventing Lesbian Cultures in America, ed. Ellen Lewin (1996). Boston: Beacon Press. Cited in Seidman 2003.
- Seidman, Steven (2003). Beyond the Closet; The Transformation of Gay and Lesbian Life. ISBN 0-415-93207-6.
- Seidman, Steven, Meeks, Chet and Traschen, Francie (1999), "Beyond the Closet? The Changing Social Meaning of Homosexuality in the United States." Sexualities 2 (1)
- Sedgwick, Eve Kosofsky. Epistemology of the Closet (reprinted 1992).
