= Ninez Ponce =

American public health researcher

Ninez Alafriz Ponce
- Education: University of California, Los Angeles; University of California, Berkeley; Harvard University
- Scientific career
- Workplaces: University of California, Los Angeles
- Thesis: Will Viet Nam grow out of malnutrition? : the impact of market transition on child growth

Ninez Alafriz Ponce is an American public health researcher who is the Fred W. & Pamela K. Wasserman Endowed Chair and a professor at the UCLA Center for Health Policy Research. Ponce leads the California Health Interview Survey, a state health survey that collects information on public health.

== Early life and education ==
Ponce studied science at the University of California, Berkeley. She holds a degree in public policy from Harvard University. Ponce returned to California, where she studied toward a doctorate at University of California, Los Angeles. Her doctoral research explored whether Vietnam could overcome malnutrition.

== Research and career ==
Ponce investigates socio-ecological predictors for health. She is an advocate for improving the quality of health data, advocating for it to go beyond including underrepresented communities and instead making them center their experience. She actively works to democratize access to data, advocating that data can be used to inform, educate and drive change.

Ponce leads the California Health Interview Survey, a state health survey that collects information on public health, sexual orientation and gender identity (SOGI) that reaches over 20,000 people a year. The survey is the only large-scale survey that includes Asian Americans and Pacific Islanders, and is available in English, Spanish, Tagalog, Vietnamese, Mandarin, Cantonese and Korean. It has been used to evaluate the impact of the federal “public charge” rule, a test used in immigration proceedings to evaluate whether immigrants are likely to depend on government assistance, and food assistance programs for undocumented migrants.

In 2019, Asian Health Services named Ponce “the People’s Researcher”. Ponce was awarded the 2024 Centers for Disease Control and Prevention Elizabeth Fries Health Education Award. Ponce was elected to the National Academy of Medicine in 2025.

== Selected publications ==
- Ninez A Ponce; Ron D Hays; William E Cunningham (1 July 2006). "Linguistic disparities in health care access and health status among older adults". Journal of General Internal Medicine. 21 (7): 786–791. doi:10.1111/j.1525-1497.2006.00491.x. ISSN 0884-8734. PMC 1924691. PMID 16808783. Wikidata Q35901502.
- Vickie M Mays; Ninez A Ponce; Donna L Washington; Susan D Cochran (23 October 2002). "Classification of race and ethnicity: implications for public health". Annual Review of Public Health. 24: 83–110. doi:10.1146/annurev.publhealth.24.100901.140927. ISSN 0163-7525. PMC 3681827. PMID 12668755. Wikidata Q35095997.
- Ninez A Ponce; Katherine J Hoggatt; Michelle Wilhelm; Beate Ritz (22 June 2005). "Preterm birth: the interaction of traffic-related air pollution with economic hardship in Los Angeles neighborhoods". American Journal of Epidemiology. 162 (2): 140–148. doi:10.1093/aje/kwi173. ISSN 0002-9262. PMC 3636775. PMID 15972941. Wikidata Q36796524.
