= Cultural depictions of Warren G. Harding =

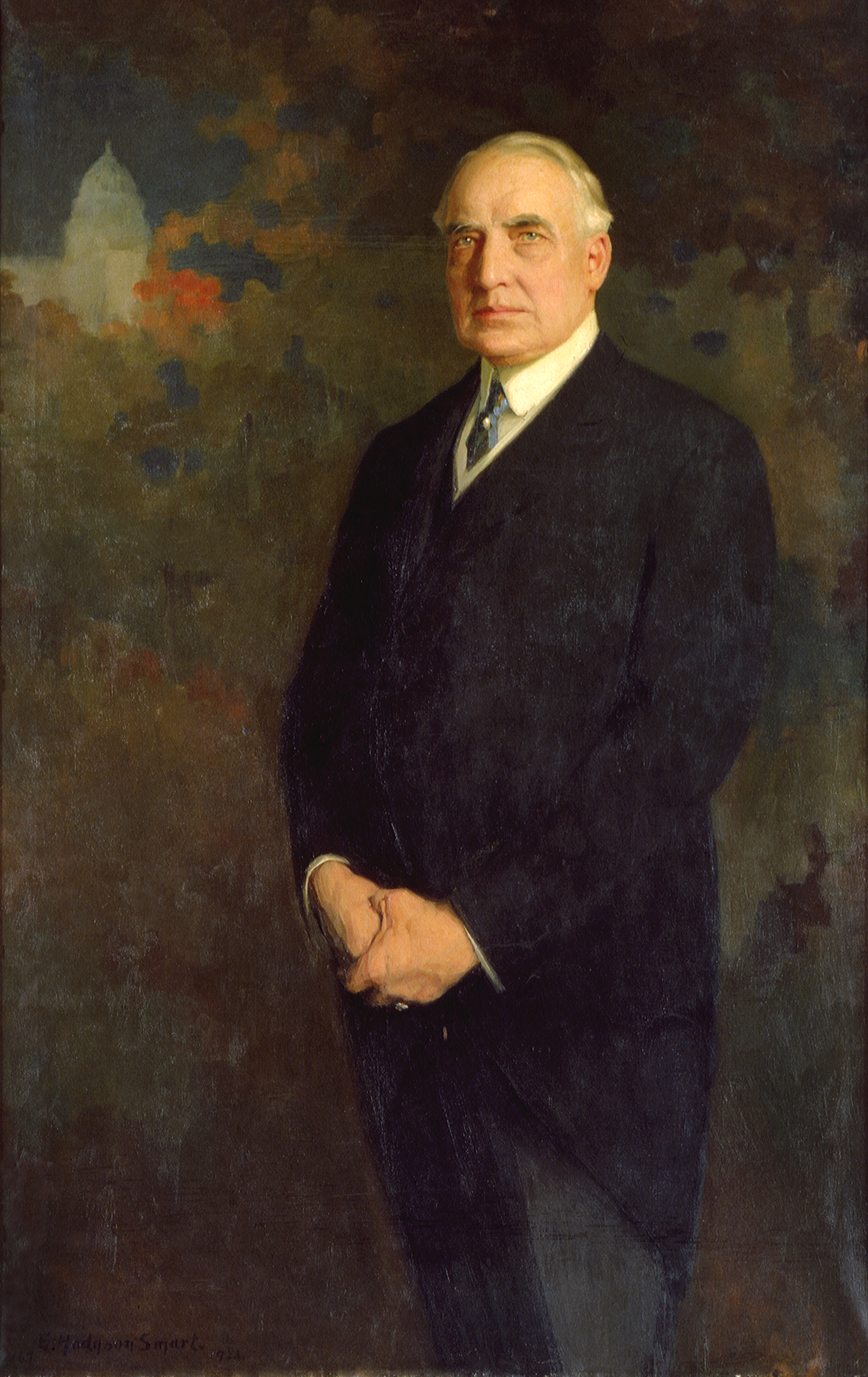
Official White House Portrait

Former US president Warren G. Harding has inspired artistic and cultural works since his presidency. The following lists cover various media including items of historic interest, enduring works of high art, and recent representations in popular culture. The entries represent portrayals that a reader has a reasonable chance of encountering rather than a complete catalog. Lesser known works are not included.

== Film, television and stage ==
- The Curse of the Hope Diamond (1975): Warren G. Harding played by Harry Dean Stanton.
- Backstairs at the White House (1979): Television episode 1.2, Warren Harding played by George Kennedy.
- The Prez: A Ragtime Scandal: A musical centered on historical life events of Warren Harding (played by Larry Marshall). Hosted by Capital Style Magazine at the National Press Club on C-SPAN, February 18, 1999.
- The American President (2000): Season One, Episode 8, Voice of President Harding: Benjamin C. Bradley.
- Boardwalk Empire (2010): Hold Me in Paradise, Warren Harding played by Malachy Cleary.
- Momma's Boys (2001): A historical play that centers on the eight previous Presidents of the United States from Ohio (including Harding), in a humorous and dramatic discussion of their lives.
- Jordan Klepper played the ghost of Harding on the May 12, 2015 episode of "The Daily Show with Jon Stewart." The segment encouraged vandalism on Wikipedia, which immediately occurred.
- Last Week Tonight with John Oliver (2017): After purchasing a wax replica of Harding from the closed Hall of Presidents and First Ladies in Pennsylvania, the show presented a fake, satirical trailer for a biographical film about Harding, using the wax figure to portray the President while other cast members humorously act around it. The fake trailer features appearances from Laura Linney, Anna Kendrick, James Cromwell, Michael McKean and Campbell Scott.
  - A follow-up sketch in the season finale features Harding with wax figures of Richard Nixon, Jimmy Carter, William Henry Harrison, and Bill Clinton, also from the Hall of Presidents and First Ladies, in a parody of The Fast and the Furious called The Wax and the Furious, wherein they try to steal Russell Crowe's jockstrap from the 2005 film Cinderella Man. Armie Hammer and Russell Crowe appear in it.
- Toon In With Me (2023): Bill Leff portrayed Harding in a parody President's Day battle with Theodore Roosevelt.

== Music ==
- Al Stewart's song "Warren Harding" (from his 1973 album Past, Present and Future) satirizes Harding's predicament by contrasting his fall with the rise of an immigrant bootlegger.

== Literature ==
- In a poem written on the subject of Harding's death, E. E. Cummings ridiculed the late President as the only man woman or child who wrote a simple declarative sentence with seven grammatical errors.
- In the novel A Barnstormer in Oz (1982) by Philip José Farmer, a modern sequel to The Wonderful Wizard of Oz, Harding authorizes a secret incursion of US military forces into the magical land of Oz. He makes a brief direct appearance, as does his wife Florence.
- Robert Plunket, My Search for Warren Harding, Alfred A. Knopf 1983; ISBN 9780811234696
  A comic novel where a historian seduces the illegitimate granddaughter of president Harding in order to access the letters written to his mistress.
- In the alternate history short story "A Fireside Chat" by Jack Nimersheim contained in the anthology Alternate Presidents (1992) edited by Mike Resnick, Harding dies from a stroke during the 1920 election campaign. This eventually leads to the election being won by the Democratic candidate James M. Cox and his running mate Franklin D. Roosevelt. However, five weeks after the election, President-elect Cox was assassinated by an anti-League of Nations activist, meaning that Roosevelt took office as the 29th President on March 4, 1921.
- Carter Beats the Devil (2001): novel by Glen David Gold wherein, at the climax of his latest touring stage show, Carter invites United States President Warren G. Harding on to stage to take part in his act hours before the President's death.
- Ki Longfellow, China Blues, Eio Books 2012; ISBN 0-9759255-7-1
  Harding looms large in this story of 1920s San Francisco, in which Harding dies during his visit to the City by the Bay.
- The Bloviator, 2012, ISBN 978-1475279535 a comic novel by Jim Yoakum that tells a semi-fictional story of Harding's last six months of life.
- In the poetry collection “The Branch Will not Break” (1963), James Wright (poet) includes “Two Poems About President Harding.” The first of these is “One: His Death” and the second is “Two: His Tomb in Ohio.”

== Artwork ==
- Presidential portrait, painted by Edmund Hodgson Smart.
