= My Search for Warren Harding =

1983 picaresque novel by Robert Plunket

- New Directions Publishing paperback cover
- Author: Robert Plunket
- Language: English
- Genre: Biographical fiction; Political fiction
- Publisher: Alfred A. Knopf
- Publication date: 1983
- Publication place: United States
- Media type: Print (hardcover)
- Pages: 257
- ISBN: 9780811234702
- OCLC: 647583544

My Search for Warren Harding is the debut picaresque novel by American writer Robert Plunket, originally published by Alfred A. Knopf in 1983. It tells the humorous monologue of historian Elliot Weiner, who has found unlikely success researching the 29th president of the United States Warren G. Harding in the budding field of 'History as Gossip'. He schemes to secretly access letters written by the president to his mistress, Rebekah Kinney, who is still living in Los Angeles.

In 2009, The Guardian included My Search For Warren Harding on its list of "1000 Novels Everyone Must Read". After falling out of print, the novel was republished in 2023 by New Directions with an introduction by Danzy Senna.

== Structure and themes ==
Structurally, My Search For Warren Harding is an autobiographical novel written in the first person by fictional historian Elliot Weiner. There are footnotes detailing grammatical disputes between the author and his typist. Weiner also includes footnotes with instructions on how to cook the various dishes he serves during a dinner party.

The novel alternates between Weiner's account of his interactions with the family of Harding's mistress, Rebekah Kinney, and his retelling of her memoir The Price of Love. Historical events are fictionalized to avoid a lawsuit from living members of the president's family.

Weiner is thought to be a closeted homosexual, oblivious to this fact himself. He describes his fascination with Morris dancing, and is more eager to write to his dance troupe than his girlfriend.

== Writing ==
Plunket was inspired by Henry James's The Aspern Papers, a novel about the search for a dead poet's letters.

He describes being "obsessed with Warren Harding and his soap opera of a life" and wanting to work this into a fictional narrative. In 1927, one of Harding's lovers, Nan Britton, wrote a best selling autobiography about their affair titled The President's Daughter. Having read this "Nabokovian" memoir, Plunket fictionalized Britton as Rebekah Kinney, the calculating and ambitious mistress of the president.

On his fascination with Britton, Plunket says;

I tracked Nan, now an old lady, to an address near Los Angeles where she may or may not have been living and I would drive by her house endlessly, hoping she’d come out on the porch, wondering if that was her Chevy in the driveway, speculating about her family. I didn’t want to meet her. I just wanted to see where she lived—the true hallmark of a stalker.

This behaviour mirrors that of the novel's protagonist, historian Elliot Weiner.

== Influence ==
Seinfeld co-creator Larry David has named My Search For Warren Harding as his favourite novel, and is known to recommend it to his staff writers. Plunket claims the book inspired Elaine's iconic dancing.

Weiner's girlfriend, Pam, is described dancing;

She is one of those people who ‘abandon’ themselves to the beat, clapping their hands over their head and emitting little yelps. To make matters worse, she studied modern dance in college and thus considers herself a Movement Expert. The thing she does—I can only describe them as Martha Graham routines. Her arms fly out into space, she makes sudden turns, then she half-squats, her head flung back in ecstasy.

== Reception ==
Time magazine described the novel as " a riotous debut: The Aspern Papers somehow performed by the Brothers Marx".

== See also ==
- Cultural depictions of Warren G. Harding
