= Vickie Mays =

American psychologist

Vickie M. Mays
- Born: Chicago, Illinois
- Education: Loyola University Chicago; University of Massachusetts, Amherst
- Awards: Award for Distinguished Contributions to Research in Public Policy from the American Psychological Association (2007); Carl Taube Award for Lifetime Contributions to the Field of Mental Health from the American Public Health Association (2020)
- Scientific career
- Fields: Public health Psychology
- Institutions: University of California, Los Angeles
- Thesis: Academic achievement and resultant achievement motivation as related to the racial and sex-role attitudes of college-level Black women (1979)

Vickie M. Mays is an American psychologist known for her research on racial disparities in health. She is a professor in the Department of Psychology in the College of Letters and Sciences and a professor in the Department of Health Services, both at the University of California, Los Angeles (UCLA). She is also the director of the BRITE Center for Science, Research and Policy at UCLA. In 2007, she received the Award for Distinguished Contributions to Research in Public Policy from the American Psychological Association, and in 2020, she received the Carl Taube Award for Lifetime Contributions to the Field of Mental Health from the American Public Health Association's Mental Health Section. In 2021, she received a President's Citation from the American Psychological Association.

== Select publications ==
- Susan D Cochran; Vickie M Mays; J Greer Sullivan (1 February 2003). "Prevalence of mental disorders, psychological distress, and mental health services use among lesbian, gay, and bisexual adults in the United States". Journal of Consulting and Clinical Psychology. 71 (1): 53–61. doi:10.1037/0022-006X.71.1.53. ISSN 0022-006X. PMC 4197971. PMID 12602425. Wikidata Q34342971.
- Ann P Haas; Mickey Eliason; Vickie M Mays; et al. (1 January 2011). "Suicide and suicide risk in lesbian, gay, bisexual, and transgender populations: review and recommendations". Journal of Homosexuality. 58 (1): 10–51. doi:10.1080/00918369.2011.534038. ISSN 0091-8369. PMC 3662085. PMID 21213174. Wikidata Q34025239.
- Susan D Cochran; Vickie M Mays (26 April 2007). "Physical health complaints among lesbians, gay men, and bisexual and homosexually experienced heterosexual individuals: results from the California Quality of Life Survey". American Journal of Public Health. 97 (11): 2048–2055. doi:10.2105/AJPH.2006.087254. ISSN 1541-0048. PMC 2040376. PMID 17463371. Wikidata Q53194936.
