= Edmund Hodgson Smart =

English painter

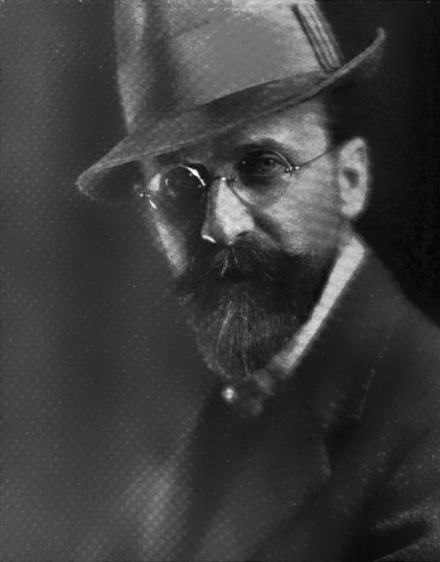
- Smart circa 1922
- Born: 1873; Alnwick, England
- Died: 1942 (aged 68–69)
- Known for: Painting

Edmund Hodgson Smart (1873–1942) was a nineteenth and twentieth-century British painter most noted for his portraits of world leaders. He was born in Alnwick, England. He studied art at the Antwerp Academy in Belgium, at the Académie Julian in Paris, and under Sir Hubert von Herkomer in England.

His painting Dawn (1907) was given to the Smithsonian Institution by the artist and is in their public collection.

== Select works ==
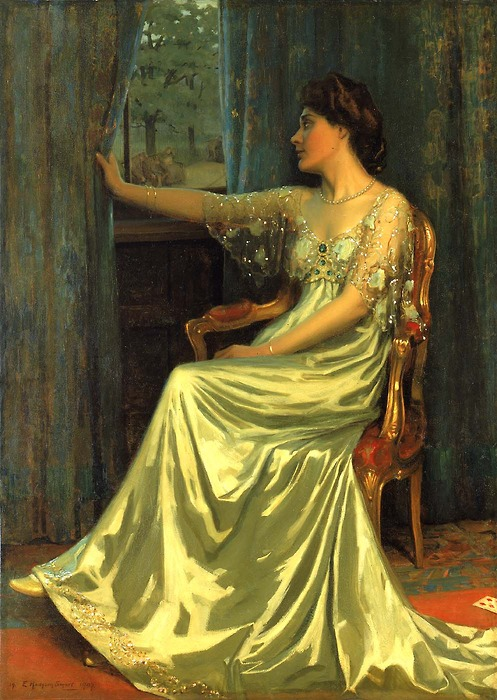
Dawn, 1907

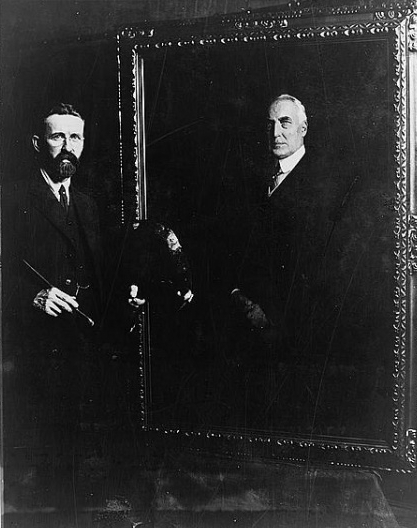
Smart standing next to his portrait of U.S. President Warren G. Harding

- Dawn, 1907
- King Edward VII of Britain
- Queen Alexandra of Britain
- American President Warren G. Harding
- Marshal Foch
- General Pershing
- Admiral William Sims
- Annie Besant, 1927
- Manly Palmer Hall, Philosophical Research Society collection
