= Carl Taube =

American statistician

Carl Arvid Taube (1939–1989) was an American statistician known for his work in mental health economics and health services research.

== Biography ==
Taube was born in New York City in 1939 to Count Arvid E. Taube and Alice N. Taube. After attending Kent School, he enrolled at Princeton University, from which he graduated in 1961 with a B.A. in sociology. He went on to receive a doctorate in sociology from American University in 1983. He began working at the National Institute of Mental Health in 1961 as a statistician, and continued to work there until 1987, eventually becoming director of their Division of Biometry and Applied Sciences. He also began a mental health economics program at the NIMH and started their "Mental Health, United States" series, a regularly published report cataloging mental health statistics in the United States. In 1980, he was awarded the Administrators Award for Meritorious Achievement from the Alcohol Drug Abuse and Mental Health Agency. In 1987, he became a professor in the Department of Mental Hygiene at the Johns Hopkins School of Hygiene and Public Health, where he continued to teach until his death. On September 28, 1989, he died of congestive heart failure at the Johns Hopkins Hospital in Baltimore, Maryland. In 1990, the American Public Health Association established the Carl Taube Award for Lifetime Contribution to the Field of Mental Health in honor of his work.
