= Robert Plunket (author) =

American author and humorist (Born 1945)

- Born: 1945 (age 80–81); Greenville, Texas
- Occupations: Novelist, Gossip columnist
- Writing career
- Period: 1983-1992
- Notable work: My Search for Warren Harding Love Junkie

Robert Plunket (born 1945) is a retired American author and humorist. His two novels maintained a cult following after their initial publication, and have been brought back into print during the 2020s. His work is known for its satiric portrayal of same-sex relationships.

Plunket witnessed the spread of the disease later known as Acquired Immunodeficiency Syndrome (AIDS) among his friends in 1980. His work is known for its representation of this time period. He later served on the board of the Sarasota AIDS Support group.

== Biography ==
Robert Plunket was born in Greenville, Texas during 1945.

His first novel, My Search for Warren Harding, was published by Alfred. A Knopf in 1983. It fell out of print, but was nevertheless included on The Guardian's 2009 list of "1000 Novels Everyone Must Read".

Plunket did not publish again until 1992 when HarperCollins released his comic novel about homosexual relationships, Love Junkie. He claims that Madonna held the film rights for many years. In 2026, it was republished by Penguin Random House under Penguin modern classics.

After his third novel failed to find a publisher, Plunket moved to Florida where he was the gossip columnist for Sarasota Magazine. His column, Mr. Chatterbox, covered the town's social scene which in the 90s was constantly attracting new wealthy members for him to skewer. While writing for the magazine in 2001, Plunket was present at Emma E. Booker Elementary School with George W. Bush when the president received news that two hijacked planes had crashed into the World Trade Center.

He currently contributes to FORUM magazine, which promotes the humanities in Florida.
