= Scott Willits =

American violin teacher (1895–1973)

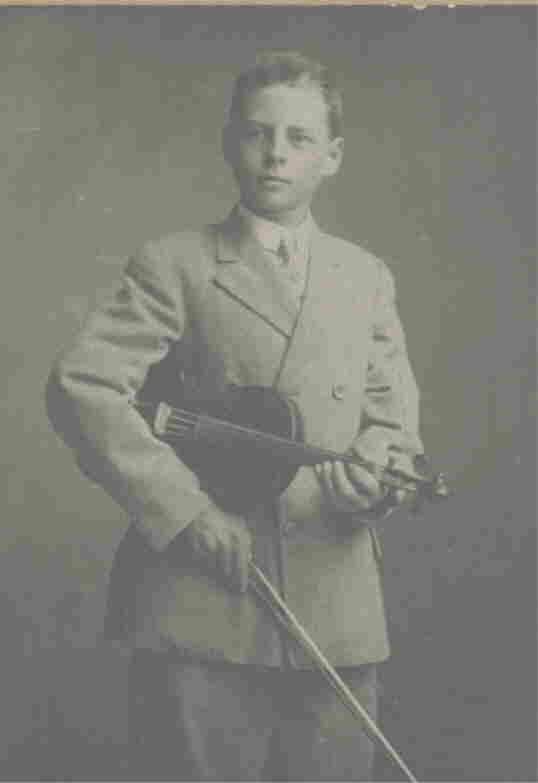
- Born: March 26, 1895
- Died: October 1973 (aged 78)
- Occupation: Violin teacher
- Spouses: Elizabeth Blanch Britton; Rose Margaret Barthel
- Relatives: Nan Britton (sister-in-law); Elizabeth Ann Blaesing (niece-in-law)

Scott Allison Willits (March 26, 1895 – October 1973) was an American violin teacher with the American Conservatory of Music in Chicago, Illinois, who coached many members of the Chicago Symphony Orchestra from 1940 through 1973. He was a student and "first American Representative" of Otakar Ševčík who created a leading pedagogical method for teaching violin that is still widely used today.

On November 21, 1917, Willits married Elizabeth Blanch Britton who was the sister of Nan Britton and aunt of Elizabeth Ann Blaesing, the illegitimate daughter of Warren G. Harding, the 29th President of the United States. In 1921, Willits and his wife adopted Blaesing. At that time the Willitses were living in Athens, Ohio, and were both teaching music at Ohio University. They raised Elizabeth Ann until her mother once again took custody five years later. The Willits' role as adoptive parents was documented in The Strange Deaths of President Harding. Willits, in recounting how he became guardian for Britton, told a student that he was summoned to the White House by President Harding. When asked how he reacted to the request Willits replied, "When the President of the United States asks for your help, you don't say 'no'."

In 2015, The New York Times reported that genetic testing by AncestryDNA, a division of Ancestry.com, confirmed Harding was Blaesing's biological father.

== Sources ==
- DNA Is Said to Solve a Mystery of Warren Harding’s Love Life. Baker, Peter. The Washington Post, Washington, DC, August 15, 2015.
- Troubled Presidency's Scandalous Footnote. Rasmussen, Cecilia. The Los Angeles Times, Los Angeles, CA, July 18, 2004
- Associated Press Wire Service. Secret Kept for Twenty Years: California Woman Says She is Daughter of Harding. Tri-City Herald, Pasco, Washington, p. 15, July 17, 1964.
- Dean, John; Schlesinger, Arthur M. Warren Harding (The American President Series), Times Books, 2004. ISBN 0-8050-6956-9
- Ferrell, Robert H. The Strange Deaths of President Harding. University of Missouri Press, 1996. ISBN 0-8262-1202-6
- Mee, Charles Jr. The Ohio Gang: The World of Warren G. Harding: A Historical Entertainment M. Evans & Company, 1983. ISBN 0-87131-340-5
- Presidential mystery stays unsolved. Sloat, Bill. The Plain Dealer, Cleveland, Ohio, May 31, 2006.
- Peter Marsh Biography. USC Thornton School of Music: Faculty Profiles http://www.usc.edu/schools/music/private/faculty/pmarsh.php
- Private Interview with former students, Mr. and Mrs. Charles A. Covey, 1970
