= Charles E. Sawyer =

American homeopath and Physician to the President

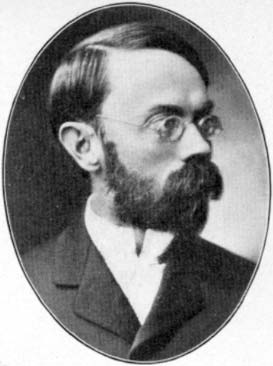
- C.E. Sawyer, c. 1900

Physician to the President
- In office 1921–1923
- President: Warren G. Harding
- Preceded by: Cary T. Grayson
- Succeeded by: James Francis Coupal

Personal details
- Born: January 23, 1860 Wyandot, Ohio, U.S.
- Died: September 23, 1924 (aged 64) Marion, Ohio, U.S.

Charles Elmer Sawyer (January 24, 1860 – September 23, 1924) was a homeopathic physician who was the longtime personal doctor to U.S. President Warren G. Harding and First Lady Florence Kling Harding. Sawyer is often blamed in the matter of Harding's death in 1923.

== Education and private practice ==
Sawyer was born in Wyandot, Ohio, and raised in Nevada, Ohio, in Wyandot County, the eldest of six children and only one to survive to adulthood. He married May Elizabeth Barron. Sawyer had one son, Carl, born in 1881.

Sawyer was an 1881 graduate of the Cleveland Homeopathic Hospital College, Cleveland, Ohio, earning his degree in homeopathy, and began his practice outside of LaRue, Ohio, in western Marion County, Ohio. Following a brief period in Indianapolis, the Sawyers returned to Marion in 1895 where Dr. Sawyer began the construction of a modern sanatorium for the treatment of medical and emotional maladies. This building was built in three stages and is currently located on South Main Street in Marion, Ohio; the building is currently known as the Elite (E-light) Apartments. Sawyer also operated the Parkview Sanatorium in Columbus, Ohio, under the corporate name of "Ohio Sanatorium Company".

He also became the director of the Marion National Bank and president of the Marion Masonic Temple Company. Sawyer was also a director of the Marion Commercial Club. He was an atheist.

In the early years of the 20th century, Sawyer expanded his practice with the construction of the White Oaks Sanatorium immediately south of Marion, Ohio. The sanatorium's name was derived from the White Oaks Farm, which the Sawyers purchased and used as the location of their new facility. White Oaks was a compound of buildings which enclosed a courtyard. Buildings included patient wards, called cottages, which were located inside the cloister. Buildings ringing the outside of the cloister included a Nurses dormitory, administrative offices, dining hall for patients who were ambulatory, sterile surgery, physical rehabilitation building, facilities for dental work and doctors offices.

It was here, in Rose Cottage, that former First Lady Florence Kling Harding spent time near the end of her life. She then returned to live in Sawyer's former home at 1201 Bellefontaine Avenue in Marion, where she died in November 1924. The home on Bellefontaine Avenue was destroyed by fire on August 19, 2010. White Oaks institution continued to operate until the late 1960s. The site is now known as Sawyer Ludwig Park and is operated by the Marion, Ohio, Department of Parks and Recreation.

Dr. Sawyer's relationship with the family of Warren G. Harding’s parents began when Sawyer stepped forward to save the reputation of Harding’s mother, Dr. Phoebe Dickerson Harding. Harding’s mother had been caring for a sick child and provided a prescription for the child, which unknown to her also contained an opiate; the child died from the drug. Sawyer stepped forward to validate Phoebe Harding’s diagnosis and treatment, thus saving her career.

== President Harding's death ==
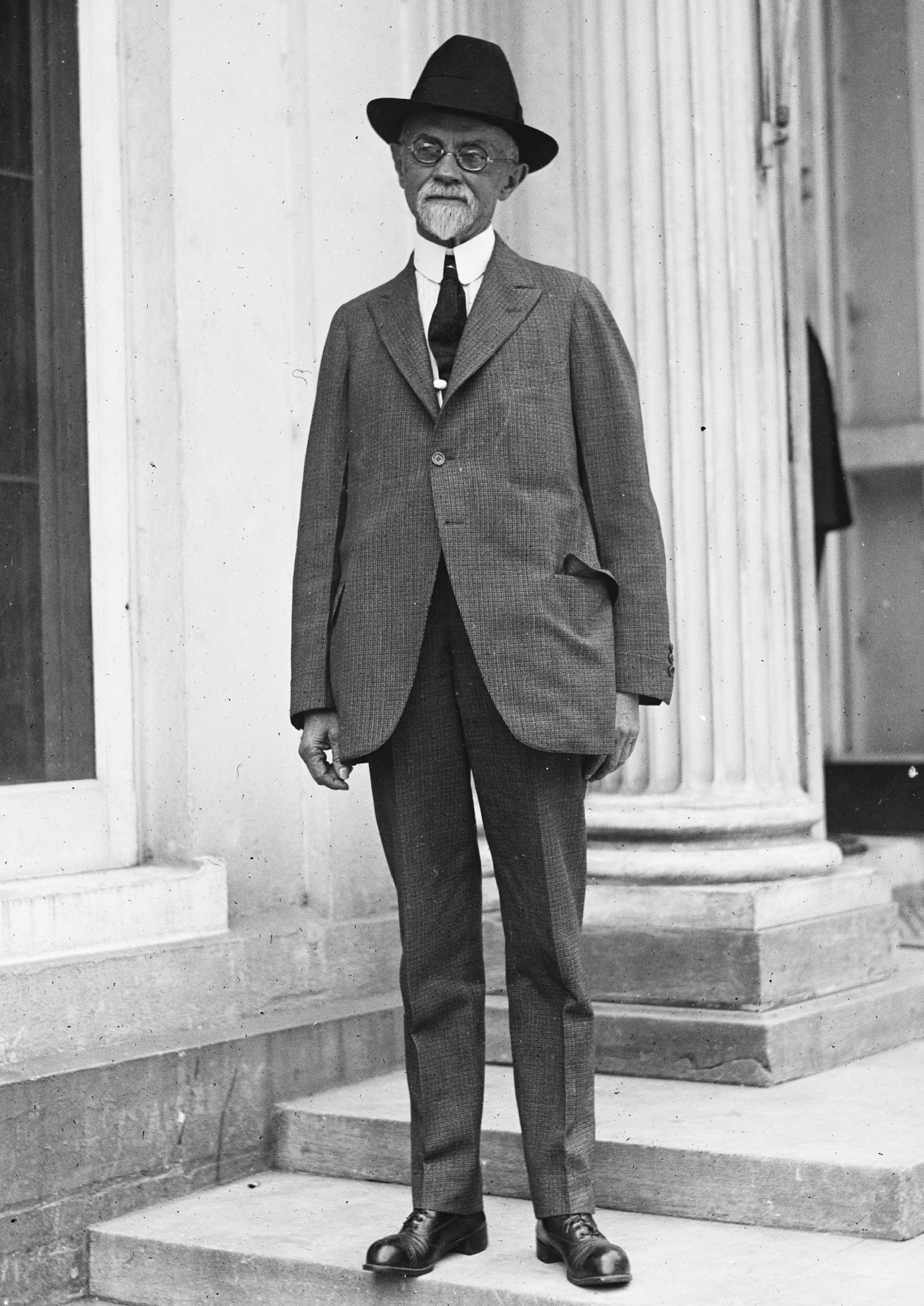
Sawyer at the White House in 1923

Sawyer acted as the personal physician to both Warren G. Harding and Florence Harding. He never accepted payment from them for his services; in doing so he felt that he provided himself a level of protection in the event that either died while under his care. Sawyer diagnosed and successfully treated Mrs. Harding’s "floating kidney" condition, the first doctor to do so, and thus gained her loyalty.

Harding gave Sawyer the rank of brigadier general in the Army Medical Corps.

Sawyer's reliance on dated medical practices resulted in the misdiagnosis of the President's coronary condition that led to the President's death in San Francisco in 1923. Joel Boone, M.D., the Vice Admiral in the United States Naval Medical Corps, had diagnosed the condition while Harding was on tour in Alaska. Sawyer deferred to the attending physician; however, Harding insisted on finishing the trip. It has even been speculated that Sawyer's use of harsh purgatives was the cause of Harding's fatal heart attack. The nursing notes from President Harding's medical records do not support this contention. Harding died of congestive heart failure and suffered a fatal heart attack. Harding's medical records from the western trip (the six-week trip during which he died) exist, and they show a man suffering from high blood pressure, chest pains, respiratory discomfort, indigestion, etc. Cardiac medicine was in its infancy, and these symptoms, while very recognizable symptoms in the modern day, were not automatic signals then for an impending catastrophic event. At Sawyer's recommendation, Mrs. Harding did not have an autopsy performed.

Following the President's death, Sawyer resigned his commission, and focused his attention on the formation of the Harding Memorial Association, to which the task of designing and building the Harding Memorial in Marion fell. Sawyer died within a month of the announcement that a location had been secured, which delayed completion of the marble memorial until December 1927. The memorial was dedicated in 1931 by President Herbert Hoover.

Sawyer's practice and leadership within the Harding Memorial Association fell to his son, Dr. Carl Sawyer, who ran both organizations until his death in the late 1960s. In the 1980s, the Harding Memorial and the Harding Home were transferred to the Ohio Historical Society.

Military offices
Preceded by Cary T. Grayson	Physician to the President; 1921–1923	Succeeded by James Francis Coupal
