= Elizabeth Ann Blaesing =

Daughter of Warren Harding (1919–2005)

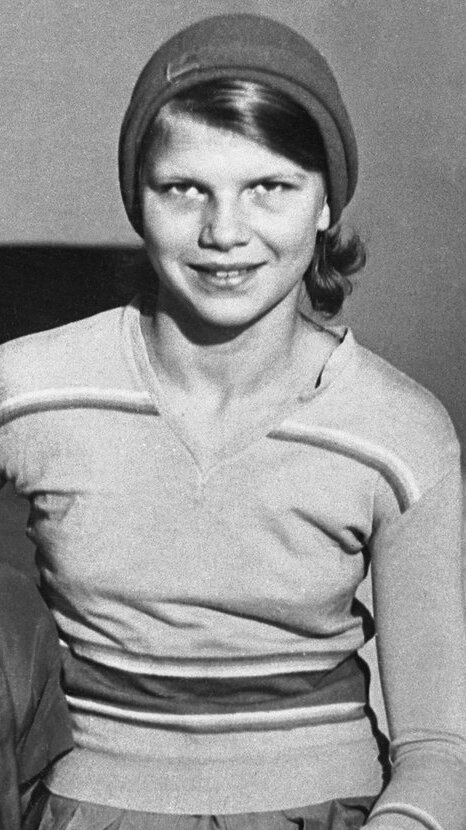
- Elizabeth Ann Britton aged 12 in 1931
- Born: Elizabeth Ann Britton Harding; October 22, 1919; Asbury Park, New Jersey, U.S.
- Died: November 17, 2005 (aged 86); Welches, Oregon, U.S.
- Education: Roger C. Sullivan High School
- Spouse: Henry Edward Blaesing (m. 1938; died 1995)
- Children: 3
- Parents: Warren G. Harding; Nan Britton
- Relatives: Scott Willits (uncle)

Elizabeth Ann Britton Blaesing (née Harding; October 22, 1919 – November 17, 2005) was the daughter of Warren G. Harding, the 29th president of the United States, and his mistress, Nan Britton. Harding and Britton, who both lived in Marion, Ohio, began their affair when he was a U.S. senator and it continued until his sudden death during his presidency in 1923.

== Biography ==
Elizabeth Ann, after her birth in Asbury Park, New Jersey, was given to her aunt and uncle, Elizabeth and Scott Willits of Athens, Ohio, to be raised. The Willitses were both music professors at Ohio University. She lived in Athens for several years until she was taken back by Britton once Britton's book was published. Blaesing graduated from Sullivan High School in the Rogers Park neighborhood of Chicago, Illinois. Later she married Henry Edward Blaesing on September 18, 1938, in Chicago. At the time Britton began a series of newspaper interviews discussing "Ann Harding" and her marriage, but refusing to provide the name of her husband.

In the late 1950s and early 1960s, Ann, her husband, and her sons lived on Alderdale Street in Downey, California. In the mid-1960s the family moved to Glendale, California. In 1964, the matter of Harding's alleged paternity of Blaesing was again brought to the forefront when a series of lawsuits in Ohio involving the ownership of love letters written by Harding to his late mistress Carrie Phillips were taking place. In an Associated Press wire service article distributed in mid-July of that year, Blaesing confirmed publicly that in 1934 her mother had told her that Warren G. Harding was her biological father. "It's not something that you bring up in casual conversation," she stated in the story.

When contacted by Harding scholar Robert Hugh Ferrell, author of The Strange Deaths of President Harding and later by John Dean, author of Warren Harding, The American President Series, Blaesing refused interviews on the topic.

Blaesing died in Oregon on November 17, 2005. The family did not make a public announcement, but her son, Thomas Blaesing, confirmed her death. According to Blaesing's son, his mother was not interested in seeking DNA evidence confirming paternity. Some scholars argued that the Blaesings had a "moral and civic responsibility" to provide their DNA for comparative purposes.

== Paternity of President Harding ==
Nan Britton made her claim public with the publication of her book, The President's Daughter. Britton could never produce primary source evidence to prove that Harding acknowledged his paternity of the child.

=== DNA confirmation ===
In 2015, 96 years after Blaesing's birth and 10 years after her death, genetic testing by AncestryDNA, a division of Ancestry.com, confirmed that President Harding was her biological father. Dr. Peter Harding, a grandnephew of President Harding, and James Blaesing, son of Elizabeth Ann Blaesing, submitted DNA samples, which confirmed that Peter and James are second cousins. This proved that Harding is the father and grandfather of Elizabeth and James, respectively.

== Sources ==
- Associated Press Wire Service. Secret Kept for Twenty Years: California Woman Says She is Daughter of Harding. Tri-City Herald, Pasco, Washington, p. 15, July 17, 1964.
- Dean, John; Schlesinger, Arthur M. Warren Harding (The American President Series), Times Books, 2004. ISBN 0-8050-6956-9
- Robert H. Ferrell (1996). The Strange Deaths of President Harding. University of Missouri Press. ISBN 978-0-8262-1202-3.
- Mee, Charles Jr. The Ohio Gang: The World of Warren G. Harding: A Historical Entertainment M. Evans & Company, 1983. ISBN 0-87131-340-5
- History's DNA. Appel, Jacob M. The Chicago Tribune. August 21, 2008.
