= Receiving vault =

Structure which temporarily stores dead bodies

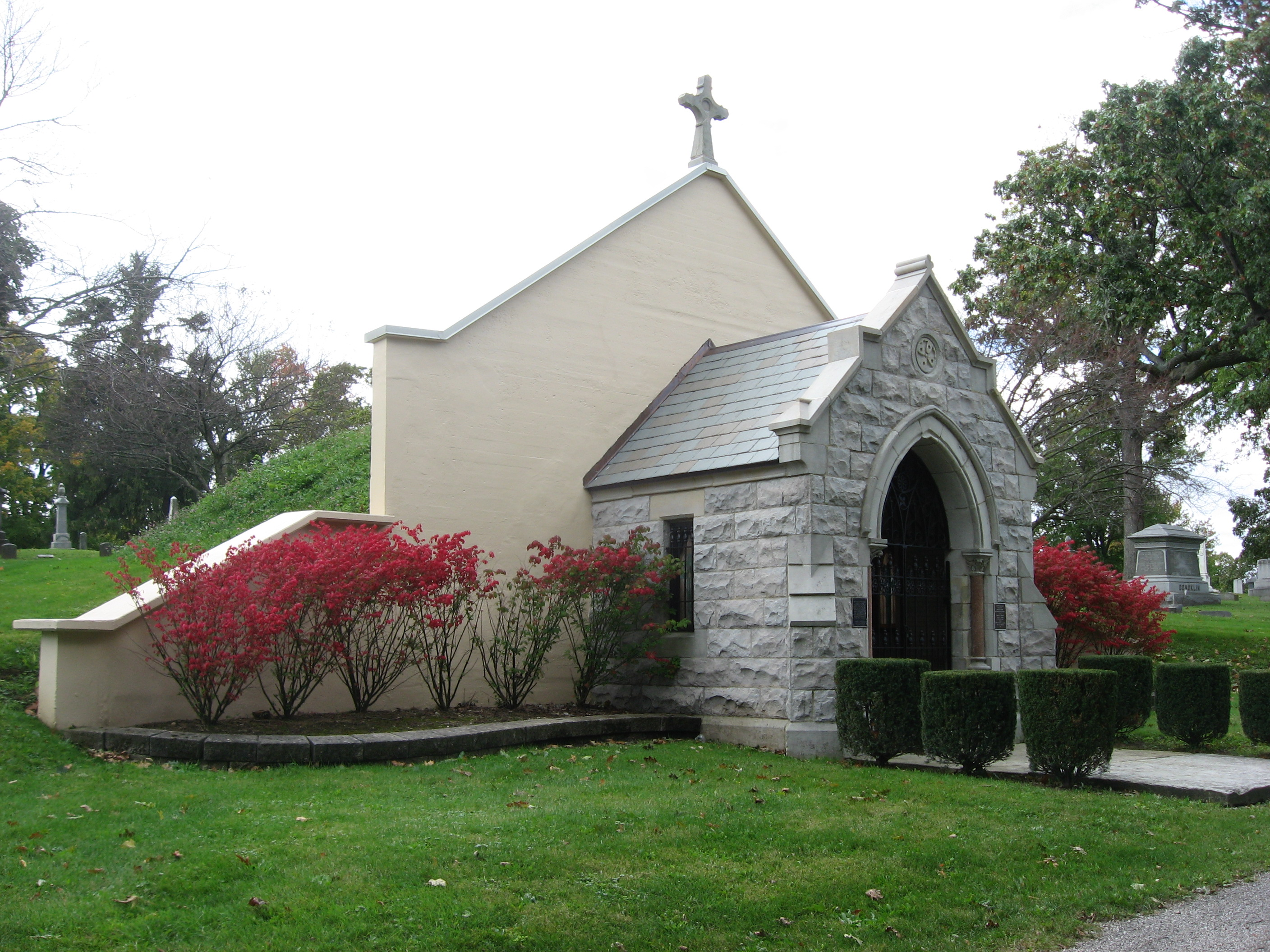
Front of the receiving vault in Marion, Ohio, United States

A receiving vault or receiving tomb, sometimes also known as a public vault, is a structure designed to temporarily store dead bodies in winter months when the ground is too frozen to dig a permanent grave in a cemetery. Technological advancements in excavation, embalming, and refrigeration have rendered the receiving vault obsolete.

== Development and use ==
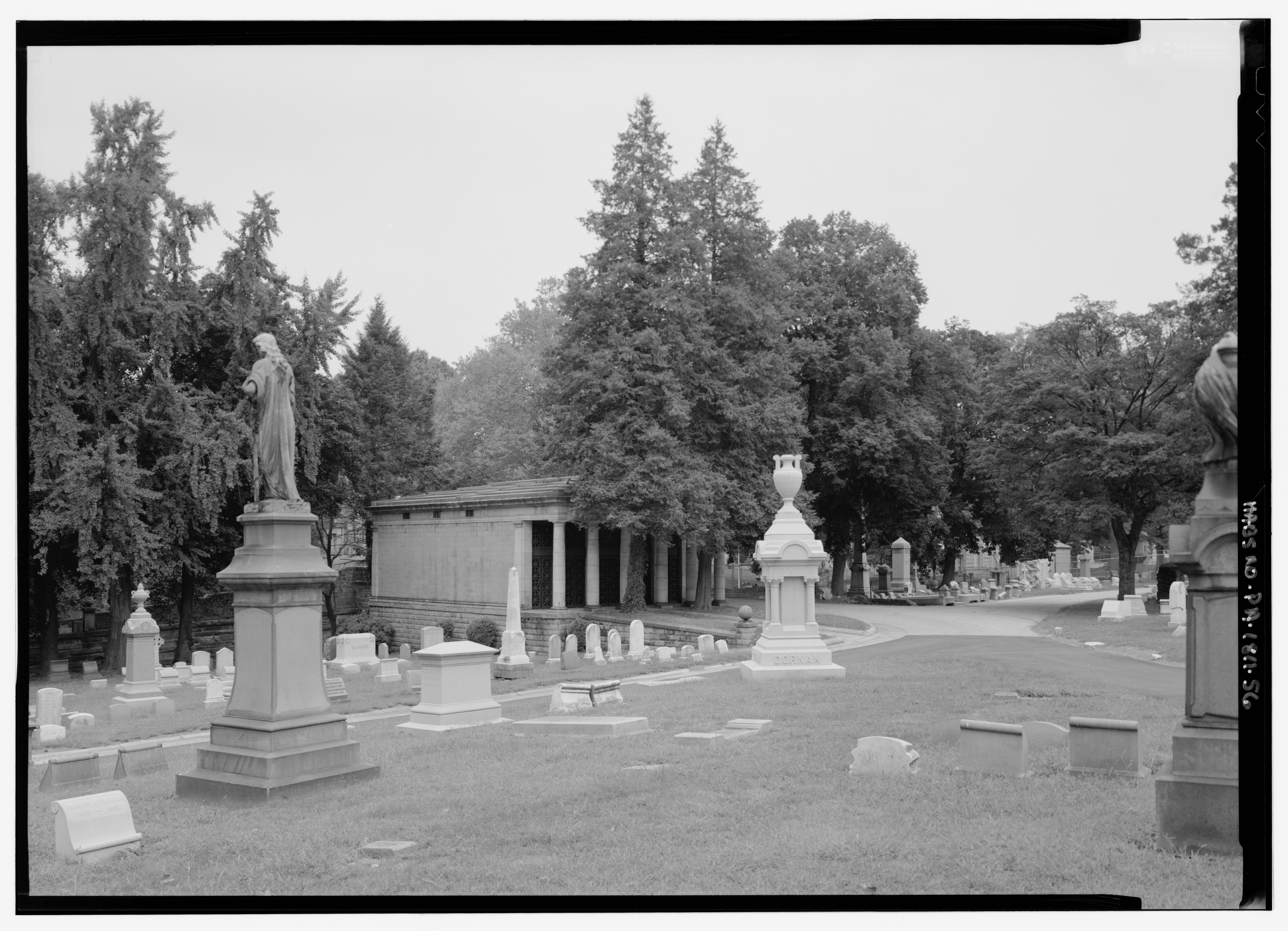
The receiving vault at Laurel Hill Cemetery in Philadelphia was built in 1913 of terra cotta

The receiving vault came into use in parts of the world such as northern Europe, northern North America, and far southern South America, where frozen ground made it difficult or impossible to dig graves during the winter months. In such areas, the receiving vault was used to temporarily store bodies until warmer weather permitted digging. Receiving vaults were also used as a temporary burial site while an elaborate mausoleum or under ground crypt was being constructed to house the remains. Occasionally they were used to temporarily bury the remains of an individual until a decision was made regarding a permanent place of burial, or until the family had the funds to arrange for a permanent place of burial.

In times of epidemics, in which large numbers of people could die within days of one another, receiving vaults were often used to hold remains until such time as individual or mass graves could be dug. Disease-bearing corpses were also often stored in the receiving vault until such time as authorities believed it was safe to handle them. Some cemeteries, however, barred the placement of diseased remains in the receiving vault for fear that the vault would become contaminated.

Receiving vaults largely ceased to be built once powered digging equipment, such as the steam shovel and backhoe, made it possible to dig graves in winter months.

== Types ==
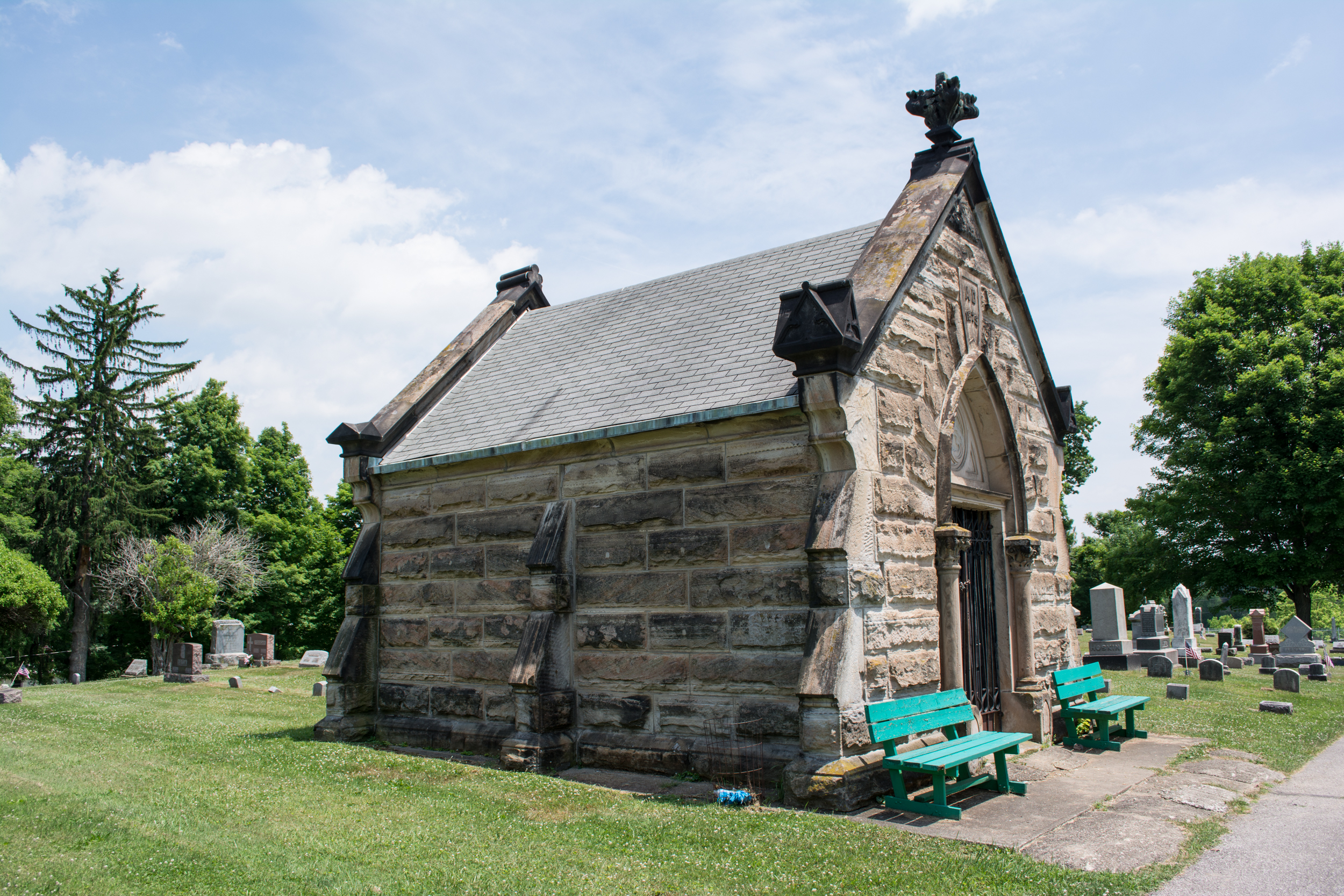
1879 receiving vault in Park Cemetery in Garrettsville, Ohio, in the United States

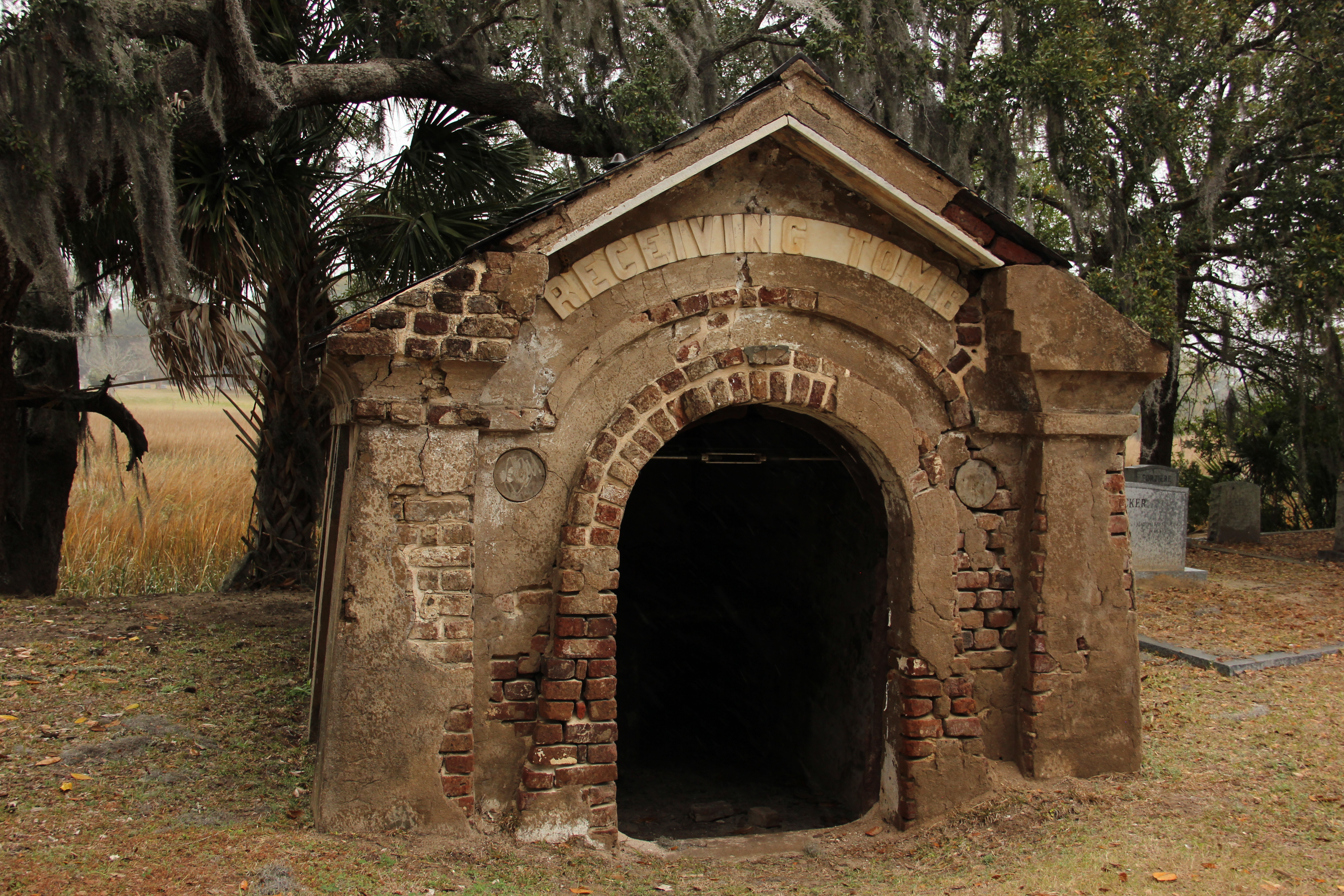
Receiving tomb in Magnolia Cemetery in Charleston, South Carolina

The receiving vault was most commonly seen from the 1800s into the early 1900s. The earliest receiving vaults were simple underground chambers dug out of hills. Where the ground was level, the receiving vault was dug into the earth, and a mound heaped over it to mimic a hill. Receiving vaults stored coffins or bodies in loculi, or shelves, set into the walls of the vault. The interiors were simple, and often plain, with heavy lockable doors to prevent entry by grave robbers or body snatchers. The practice of body snatching was still relatively common in the nineteenth century, so some cemeteries wished to provide a place where bodies could be laid without risk of theft until they had decomposed so much that they would be useless to body snatchers.

Receiving vaults built from the mid-1800s onward could be either above-ground or below-ground, and ranged from the simple structure with loculi (wall niches) for coffins to beautifully decorated, large, and ornate structures. Some cemeteries co-located a chapel (either next to or above) with the receiving vault to make it easier to hold a funeral in conjunction with the vault's use. The cost of constructing and operating the receiving vault was usually borne by the cemetery. Receiving vaults were usually located toward the center or the rear of a cemetery. Small cemeteries usually used a small, subterranean receiving vault, while larger burying grounds with more income built larger underground or above-ground structures.

== See also ==
- Dead house, usually above ground, with a similar function

== Bibliography ==
- Cook, Rodney Mims Jr. (2013). Atlanta's Parks and Monuments. Charleston, S.C.: Arcadia Publishing. ISBN 9781467110068.
- Milano, Kenneth W. (2011). Palmer Cemetery and the Historic Burial Grounds of Kensington and Fishtown. Charleston, S.C.: History Press. ISBN 9781609492427.
- Veit, Richard f.; Nonestied, Mark (2008). New Jersey Cemeteries and Tombstones: History in the Landscape. New Brunswick, N.J.: Rivergate Books. ISBN 9780813542355.
- Young, Brian J. (2003). Respectable Burial: Montreal's Mount Royal Cemetery. Montreal: McGill-Queen's University Press. ISBN 0773525297.
