= Marshall Eugene DeWolfe =

American football player

- Born: September 22, 1880; Galion, Ohio, U.S.
- Died: January 1, 1915 (aged 34); Colorado, U.S.
- Education: University of Michigan
- Spouse: Esther Naomi Neely
- Children: 2

Marshall Eugene DeWolfe (September 22, 1880 – January 1, 1915) was the only child of future First Lady Florence Harding (then, Florence Kling).

== Life ==
DeWolfe was the only child of future First Lady Florence Harding (then, Florence Kling) and her first husband, Henry Athenton "Pete" DeWolfe (May 4, 1859 – March 8, 1894). Born in Galion, Crawford County, Ohio, young DeWolfe was primarily raised by his mother; his father was a chronic alcoholic who was absent from the home for days at a time. Those doing research on the Hardings, including John Dean and Robert Ferrell among others, have never been able to find documentary proof of a regular marriage between Kling and DeWolfe, leading some people to conclude it was a common law marriage—a form of irregular marriage contracted by habit and repute, which was not abolished in Ohio until 1891. The marriage between Kling and DeWolfe is otherwise attested by the papers from their divorce proceeding, which are on file in Marion County, Ohio. It is also possible that they had a regular marriage and the officiant who solemnized it simply failed to return the marriage certificate to the county, or the county clerk's office subsequently lost it.

A record of the issuance of a marriage license was printed in The Marion Star on January 31, 1880; and the January 27, 1880, edition of the same paper refers to a marriage having occurred at Columbus on January 22, 1880. The documentary proof of a regular marriage is the marriage certificate, which is completed by the solemnizing officiant and returned to the county clerk for recordation. The marriage certificate usually comprises the lower part of the same document as the marriage license, so if the certificate gets lost on its way to the county clerk the license will be lost along with it.

Following the divorce of his parents, Marshall was raised by his grandparents, Amos Hall Kling and Louisa "Louise" Mabel (Bouton) Kling, while his mother lived independently and earned an income as a piano teacher in Marion, Ohio. As part of the agreement with her father, Florence would not have a role in her own son’s upbringing. Throughout his life, Marshall used either his Kling or DeWolfe surname.

Florence Kling DeWolfe married newspaper publisher Warren G. Harding in 1891. However, Marshall remained under his grandfather's control and roof. While a room was set aside for him in the Harding home, Marshall never felt at home under his mother's roof, and never comfortable under his grandfather's strict control.

DeWolfe studied journalism at the University of Michigan from 1899 to 1903. While attending Michigan, he played football as a quarterback on the Michigan Wolverines all-freshman football team in 1899.

DeWolfe aspired to be a newspaperman like his stepfather Warren G. Harding. By all accounts, his relationship with Harding was closer than the relationship that he had with his mother. After his graduation from Marion High School, DeWolfe was given a job at the Marion Daily Star.

DeWolfe suffered from lung trouble and, in the early 1900s, moved to Colorado for his health. He settled in Weld County where he became publisher of a newspaper then known as the Kersey Surprise, which later became the Kersey News. He lived in Kersey with his wife and two children.

== Family ==
DeWolfe married Esther Naomi Neely. Their son, George Warren DeWolfe (1914–1968), and daughter, Eugenia DeWolfe (1911–1978), were the principal heirs to the estate left by their grandmother Florence Harding following her death on November 21, 1924.

== Death ==
DeWolfe died from pneumonia in Denver, Colorado on January 1, 1915, at the age of 34. He is buried in an unmarked grave in the DeWolfe family plot in Marion Cemetery.

When Warren G. Harding ran for President in 1920, his wife skillfully bluffed reporters into believing that she had been a widow, not a divorcee, when they married. When she became First Lady, her former husband and son were forbidden topics at the White House and in the press.
