= Amos Kling House =

Historic house in Florida, United States

- U.S. National Register of Historic Places
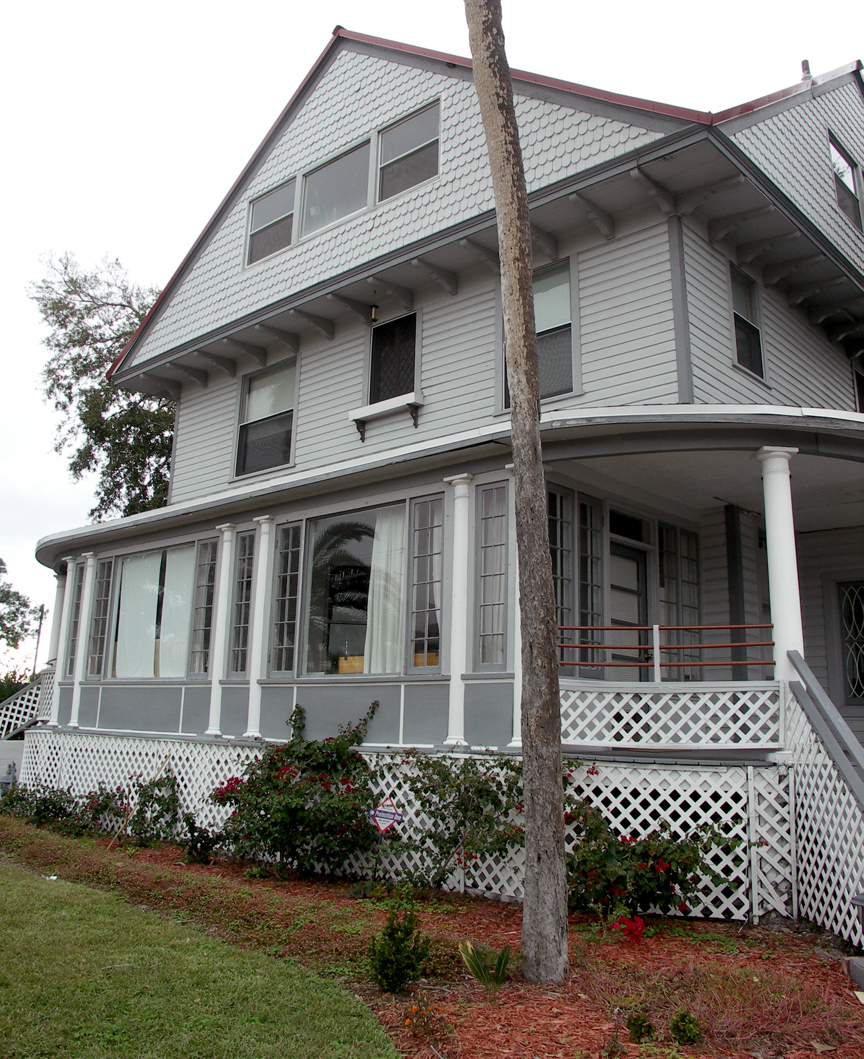

- Location within Volusia County
- Location: 220–222 Magnolia Avenue, Daytona Beach, Florida United States
- Coordinates: 29°12′34″N 81°1′18″W
- Area: less than one acre
- Built: 1907
- Architectural style: Frame Vernacular
- NRHP reference No.: 93001353
- Added to NRHP: December 2, 1993

The Amos Kling House is a historic house located in Daytona Beach, Florida. It is locally significant for its association with the development of the resort community of Daytona Beach during the early 20th century.

== Description ==
Constructed in 1907, the 2 1/2-story house has an irregular floor-plan. The frame structural system is finished on all elevations with weatherboard siding and wood shingles. It rests on a brick pier foundation with lattice infill. The cross-gable roof is sheathed with asphalt shingles. The vernacular residence is enlivened by features associated with the Shingle Style. It was the summer home of Amos Kling, the father-in-law of U.S. President Warren Harding. Currently a restaurant, the Cellar, occupies the first floor.

It was added to the National Register of Historic Places on December 2, 1993.
