= The President's Daughter (Britton) =

1927 nonfiction book by Nan Britton

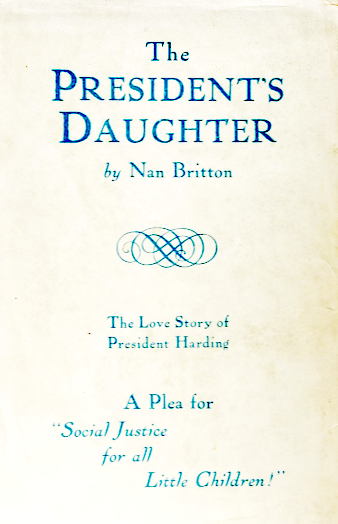
- Author: Nan Britton
- Publication date: 1927

The President's Daughter is a 1927 book by Nan Britton describing her extramarital relationship with Warren G. Harding, the President of the United States, during which they conceived a child. The book is considered the first popular bestselling kiss-and-tell American political autobiography published in the United States and caused a sensation when it was released. In 2015, DNA testing proved the book's central claim that Harding was the father of Britton's daughter Elizabeth Ann Blaesing.

== History ==
It is believed that Britton's mentor in the project, Richard Wightman, head of the Bible Corporation of America (New York City), where Britton was employed as a secretary, had substantial input into the book. In his book, The Strange Deaths of President Harding, Indiana University history professor Robert H. Ferrell states that there are similarities between phrases in The President's Daughter and Wightman's other writings, leading Ferrell to conclude that Wightman had substantial, if not complete input into the content of the book. (Britton was also named in Patricia Wightman's divorce suit against Richard Wightman in 1928.)

Unable to find a publisher who was willing to publish and distribute the book, the book was published by the Elizabeth Ann Guild, an organization that Britton founded to take up the cause of children born out of wedlock. Prior to its release, the New York Society for the Suppression of Vice (the same organization once headed by Anthony Comstock) arranged for the New York City Police to seize both the unbound printed sheets and the zinc printing plates; all materials were returned to the Elizabeth Ann Guild. Prior to publication, Congressman John Tillman (D-Arkansas) introduced a bill into the United States House of Representatives attempting to ban the sale of the book stating that the work was "a blast from Hell". Tillman also cited his belief that the book was written by a man, not Britton. The measure failed.

While the contents of the book were never challenged in court by members of the Harding family, Britton's claimed relationship with Harding did become the subject of a lawsuit filed by Britton in 1928 against Charles Klunk, who had funded the printing of the 1928 book The Answer, by Joseph DeBarthe, in which Ms. Britton's claims were denounced. In court (Britton v. Klunk, 1931, Toledo, Ohio), Britton failed to produce evidence of the relationship that she attested to in the book, and the paternity of Elizabeth Ann by Harding was never established in a court of law.

Britton died in 1991, resolute that Warren Harding had fathered her child. Elizabeth Ann Christian (Elizabeth Ann Blaesing) died on November 17, 2005; her son Thomas told the Cleveland Plain Dealer the following May that she never had an interest in proving her paternity.

== DNA testing ==
In 2015, DNA testing of Blaesing's son James confirmed that Harding was Blaesing's father, as Nan Britton had always claimed.

== Publication information ==
- Britton, Nan (1927). The President's Daughter . New York: Elizabeth Ann Guild Inc. OCLC 466438 – via Wikisource.

== General and cited sources ==
- "Democrat Solon Seeks Ban on Book", International News Service (INS) Wire Report, Mansfield News, Mansfield, Ohio, January 27, 1928, front page.
- Dean, John (2004). Schlesinger, Arthur M. (ed.). Warren Harding. The American President Series. Times Books.
- Ferrell, Robert H. (1996). The Strange Deaths of President Harding. University of Missouri Press. ISBN 978-0-8262-1202-3.
- Mee, Charles Jr. The Ohio Gang: A Historical Entertainment.
