= Marion Cemetery Receiving Vault =

- U.S. National Register of Historic Places
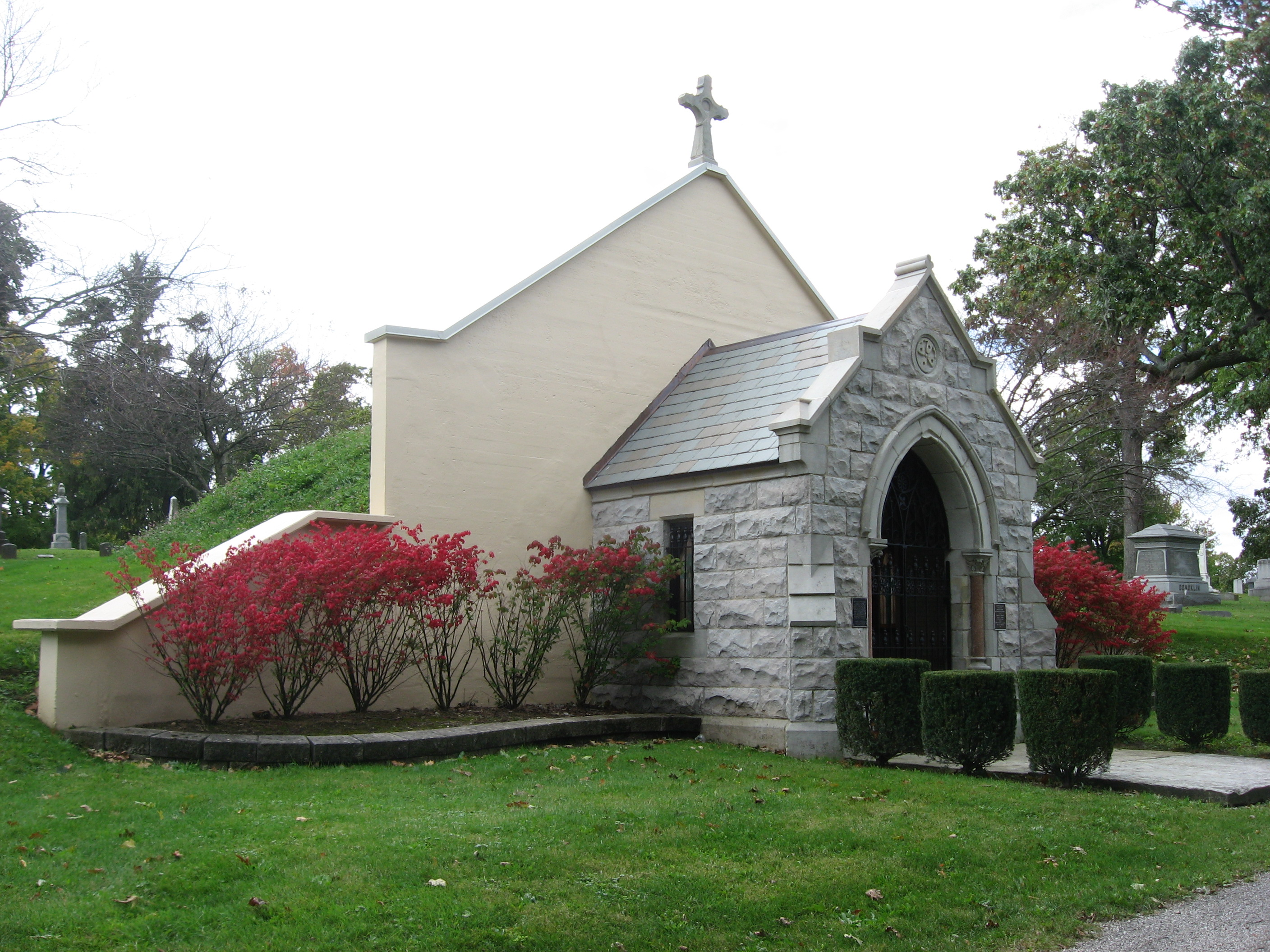
- Front and eastern side

- Location within Ohio Location within the United States
- Location: 620 Delaware Ave., Marion, Ohio
- Coordinates: 40°34′34″N 83°7′19.5″W
- Area: Less than 1 acre (0.40 ha)
- Built: 1879
- Architect: D.W. Gibbs
- Architectural style: Gothic Revival
- NRHP reference No.: 95001415
- Added to NRHP: December 13, 1995

The Marion Cemetery Receiving Vault is a funerary structure in Marion Cemetery of Marion, Ohio, United States. Constructed in the 1870s, this receiving vault originally fulfilled the normal purposes of such structures, but it gained prominence as the semipermanent resting place of Marion's most prominent citizen, U.S. President Warren G. Harding.

== Construction ==
The vault is a limestone structure with a slate roof; it rests on a concrete foundation. Plans to build it were formulated as early as 1873, when the cemetery association voted to make plans for one; funds were insufficient, so the association decided not to build until sufficient money had become available. Six years later, the cemetery's trustees decided to build a vault, and to design it, they hired Toledo architect D.W. Giffs.

Among the association's reasons for building the vault was the desire to avoid a modern form of grave robbery: the practice of body snatching was still relatively common, and the association wished to provide a place where bodies could be laid without risk of theft until they had decomposed so much that they would be useless to body snatchers. Accordingly, the final design for the vault included iron gates with secure locks. Other elements of the design included a double-arched ceiling, the creation of ventilation and related systems, and the placement of fine marble and carpet to beautify the structure and retard the harshness of death for decedents' family members at funerals. The entire structure is built into a hillside.

== Hardings ==
Warren Gamaliel Harding died in early August 1923 while in office as President of the United States. The suddenness of his death produced chaos even on a personal level, as funeral services and a burial location had to be worked out suddenly, and his wife, Florence Harding, was forced to return to Washington, D.C. to wrap up her affairs and to move her possessions out of the White House in order to permit its new occupants, President Calvin Coolidge and First Lady Grace Coolidge, to move in. Accordingly, no permanent burial place was employed immediately after his death, and funeral services were held at the Receiving Vault: Harding's family already owned burial plots in the cemetery, but a grander destination was planned for the deceased chief executive.

In the meantime, soldiers from Fort Hayes in Columbus guarded the vault for six months. As plans were being made for the construction of a permanent presidential tomb elsewhere in the city, his body remained in the vault, being joined by Mrs. Harding's body after her death in 1924. The two continued to wait until the practical completion of the memorial in 1927; they were then moved to their permanent burial sites inside the memorial, although four more years passed before it was formally dedicated.

== Preservation ==
Two weeks before Christmas 1995, the Receiving Vault was listed on the National Register of Historic Places, qualifying both because of its architecture and because of the place it had played in the events of 1923. It is one of two National Register-listed sites in Marion's city cemetery — the chapel had been listed nine months before — and one of fourteen such locations throughout Marion County. Among these fourteen are Harding's permanent tomb and his home on Marion's east side.
