= Nan Britton =

Mistress of Warren G. Harding (1896–1991)

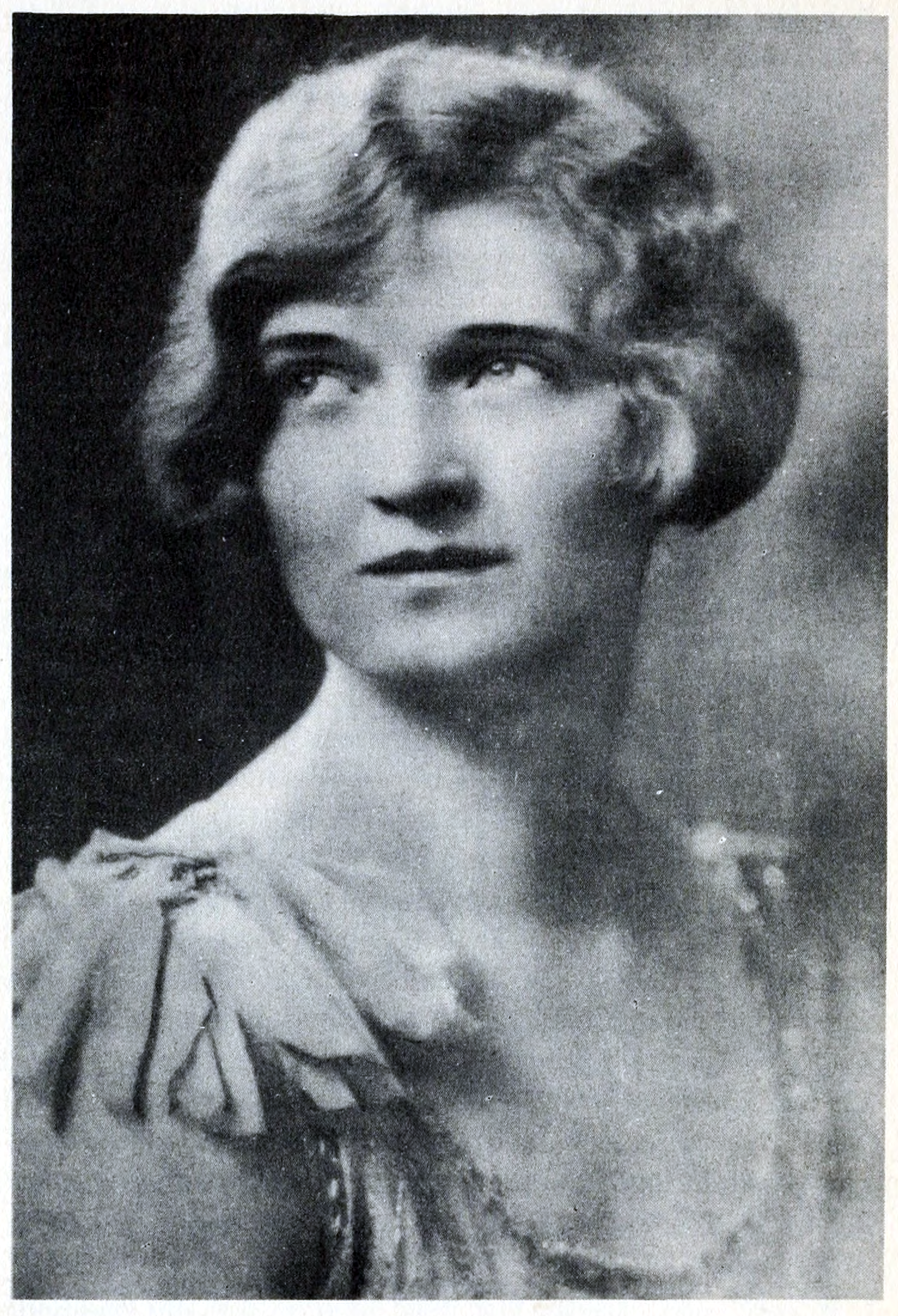
- Britton in 1926
- Born: Nanna Popham Britton; November 9, 1896; Marion, Ohio, U.S.
- Died: March 21, 1991 (aged 94); Sandy, Oregon, U.S.
- Occupation: Secretary
- Partner: Warren G. Harding (father of her child)
- Children: Elizabeth

Nanna Popham Britton (November 9, 1896 – March 21, 1991) was an American woman who gained notoriety as a mistress of Warren G. Harding, the 29th President of the United States. In 1927, Britton revealed that her daughter, Elizabeth, had been fathered by Harding while he was serving in the United States Senate, one year before his election to the presidency. Britton's claim was open to question during her lifetime, but in 2015, Harding's paternity was finally confirmed by DNA testing.

== Relationship with Harding ==
Harding and Britton's family both lived in Marion, Ohio. Harding's younger sister, Abigail, was Britton's high school English teacher. Britton was in her early teens when she developed a crush on Harding, which rapidly became an obsession. Nan's father, physician Samuel H. Britton, spoke to Harding about his teenage daughter's infatuation, and Harding met with her, telling her that some day she would find the man of her dreams. Harding had married his wife Florence in 1891 and was involved in a long and passionate affair with Carrie Fulton Phillips, wife of James Phillips, co-owner of a Marion department store. After graduating from high school in 1914, Britton moved to New York City, to begin a career as a secretary. She claimed she also began an intimate relationship with Harding at this time.

Following President Harding's sudden death in August 1923, Britton wrote what is considered to be the first kiss-and-tell book. In The President's Daughter, published in 1927, she told of her life as Harding's mistress throughout his presidency and named him as the father of her daughter, Elizabeth Ann (1919–2005). One famous passage told of their having sexual relations in a closet near the President's office in the White House.

According to Britton, Harding had promised to support their daughter, but after his death, his wife refused to honor the obligation. Britton decided to write a tell-all book to earn money to support her daughter and to champion the rights of illegitimate children. She brought a lawsuit (Britton v. Klunk), but she was unable to provide any concrete evidence and was shaken by the vicious personal attacks made by Congressman Grant Mouser during the cross examination, which cost her the case.

Britton's portrayal of Harding and his colloquialisms paints a picture of a crude womanizer. In his 1931 book Only Yesterday: An Informal History of the 1920s, Frederick Lewis Allen wrote that on the testimony of Britton's book, Harding's private life was "one of cheap sex episodes" and that "one sees with deadly clarity the essential ordinariness of the man, the commonness of his 'Gee dearie' and 'Say, you darling'." Britton's book was among those irreverently reviewed by Dorothy Parker for The New Yorker magazine as part of her famous Constant Reader column, under the title "An American DuBarry".

In 1964, the discovery of more than 250 love letters that Harding had written to Carrie Fulton Phillips between 1909 and 1920 gave further credence to Britton's own claims. At that time, Britton was living in seclusion in Illinois; she was located by journalist R.W. Apple Jr. but she refused him an interview. Even at this time, over a generation later, her daughter and grandchildren would "occasionally be hounded by hateful skeptics" with threats and other unwanted attention that seemed to intensify during presidential election years.

In the 1980s, Britton and her extended family moved to Oregon, where her three grandchildren were living as of 2015. Britton died in 1991 in Sandy, Oregon, where she had lived during the last years of her life. She insisted until her death that Harding was Elizabeth's father. In 2015, 24 years after Britton's death (and 10 years after Elizabeth's), Ancestry.com confirmed through DNA testing of descendants of Harding's brother and Britton's grandchildren that Elizabeth was unquestionably Harding's daughter.

== In popular culture ==
Nan Britton was portrayed by Virginia Kull in season one of HBO's Boardwalk Empire.

American author Robert Plunket wrote a fictionalized version of Britton's affair with president Harding in the 1983 novel My Search for Warren Harding.

== General sources ==
- Anthony, Carl Sferrazza. Florence Harding, William Morrow and Co., New York City, 1998, ISBN 0-688-07794-3
- Britton, Nan. The President's Daughter. Elizabeth Ann Guild, Inc., New York City, 1927 (reprinted 1973), ISBN 0-8369-7132-9.
- Dean, John; Schlesinger, Arthur M. Warren Harding, The American President Series, Times Books, 2004, ISBN 0-8050-6956-9
- Ferrell, Robert H. The Strange Death of President Harding, University of Missouri Press, 1996, ISBN 0-8262-1202-6
- Mee, Charles Jr. The Ohio Gang: The World of Warren G. Harding: A Historical Entertainment, M. Evans & Company, 1983, ISBN 0-87131-340-5
