= Wyandot, Ohio =

Unincorporated community in Ohio, United States

Coordinates: 40°43′53″N 83°07′11″W

Wyandot is an unincorporated community in Wyandot County, in the U.S. state of Ohio.

== History ==
A schoolhouse was in operation at Wyandot by 1828. A post office called Wyandot opened in 1837, and was discontinued in 1905. Dr. Charles E. Sawyer, the personal physician of Warren G. Harding, was born in Wyandot in 1860.
