= Amos Kling =

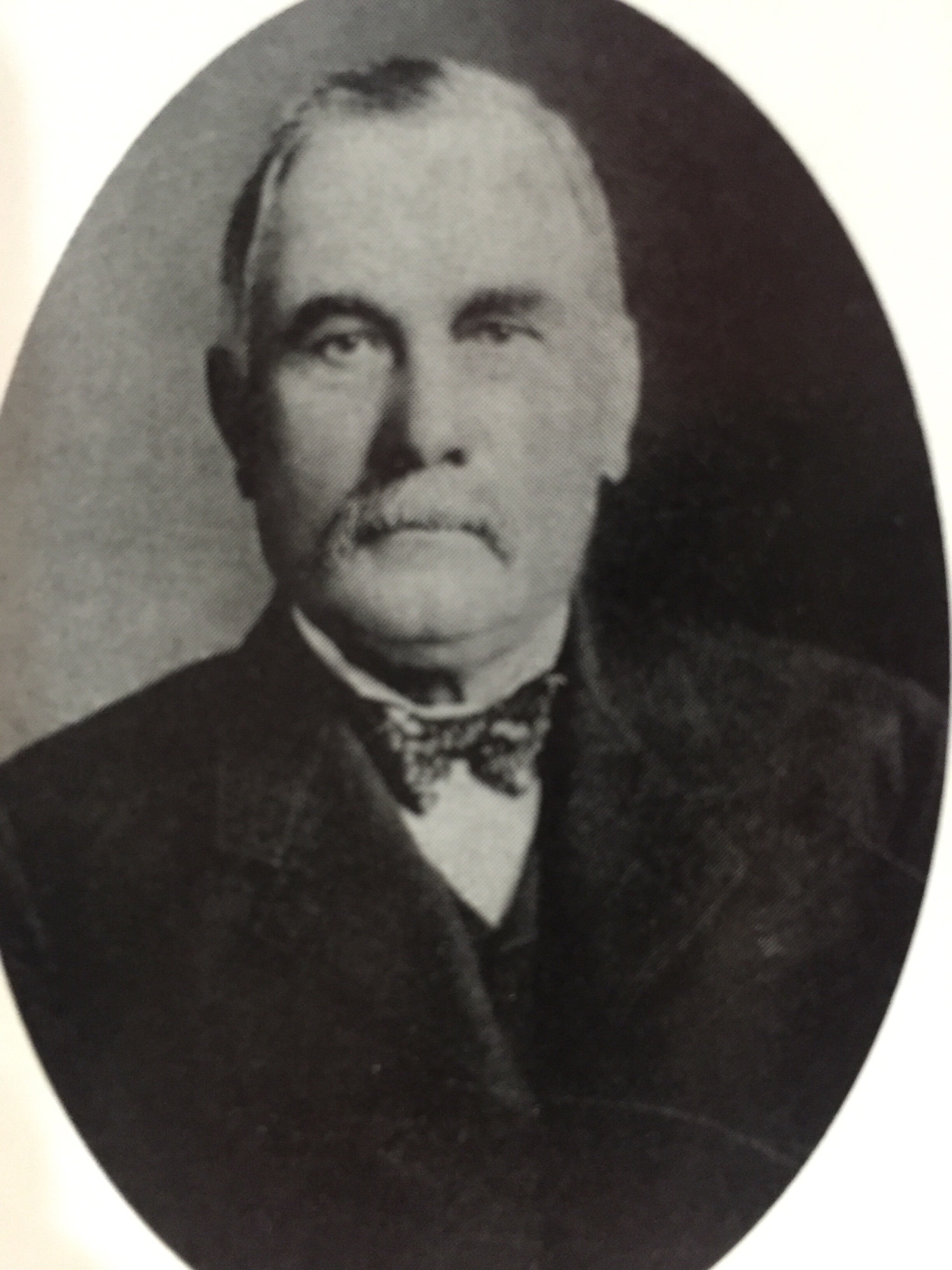
- Born: Amos Hall Kling; June 15, 1833; Lancaster County, Pennsylvania, U.S.A.
- Died: October 20, 1913 (aged 80)
- Spouses: Louisa Mabel Bouton (m. 1859; died 1893); Caroline Beatty Denman (m. 1906)
- Children: 3 including, Florence Harding
- Relatives: Warren G. Harding (son-in-law); Marshall Eugene DeWolfe (grandson)

Amos Hall Kling (June 15, 1833 – October 20, 1913) was an American businessman. He was the father-in-law of U.S. President Warren Harding.

== Early life ==
Kling was born on June 15, 1833, in Lancaster County, Pennsylvania, the third of nine children born to Micheal and Elizabeth Kling. His father was of German descent, while his mother was born in France. At a young age, Amos learned the trade of a tailor. The Klings moved to Mansfield, Ohio, and took up farming when Amos was a teenager. Amos graduated from W.W. Granger's commercial college in Mansfield in 1854 and moved to Marion, Ohio, the following year. Kling took a job as a clerk in Bain's Hardware store and soon saved up enough money to buy the store. He met Louisa Bouton during a trip to New Canaan, Connecticut, in the late 1850s. Said to be the most popular girl in town, Kling wed her on September 27, 1859. When the couple returned to Marion, her family came as well and Bouton's father established a shoe company.

== Family and business career ==
His first daughter Florence was born in 1860, followed by Clifford in 1861 and Vetallis in 1866. Kling had preferred Florence be born a boy, but resolved to raise her more masculine than feminine. At the dawn of the U.S. Civil War, Kling was a solid Republican, not because of opposition to slavery but rather because it was better for business. His primary business during the war was in bulk sales of nails used by the Union Army. Three of his brothers were killed fighting for the Union. Kling retired from the hardware business in 1866 on account of poor health.

Kling became a prosperous businessman from selling real estate, importing horses from France, and other business pursuits. He was on the boards of the Marion Telephone Company, the Marion National Bank, and the Columbus and Toledo Railroad, as well as owning a share in the Marion Hotel. The family moved to a large white mansion in the late 1860s. He had Florence learn business skills by having her do accounting at the hardware store at a young age and ensured she received a good education. Carl S. Anthony wrote that Kling was "ruthlessly harsh in his view of the world and life in general" and "driven only by work and money." His commitments to civic endeavors were calculated to bring him in more money, and he did not provide money for local efforts without having a controlling voice. A leading Marionite, Col. George Christian, described Kling as "not a man to deal unjustly with anyone" and "honest and upright". He expanded his influence by joining the local agricultural society and becoming its president, becoming a member of the school board, and overseeing the construction of the new courthouse and opera house. Florence eloped with Henry "Pete" deWolfe, whose father had a poor relationship with Kling, at the age of 19 and a son Marshall was born on March 22, 1880. Henry deWolfe soon lost interest in providing for the family and divorced Florence in the spring of 1886. After the divorce, Kling and his wife raised the boy while Florence was free to make a living as a piano teacher.

When Kling found out that his daughter was dating a young newspaper publisher named Warren Harding in 1886, he was furious. Harding had previously been critical of Kling's dealings with the government, but what most infuriated Kling was a rumour that Harding had partial black ancestry. Kling responded by threatening to disinherit Florence and began to spread the rumour further. By the time Harding found out about this, he threatened to beat up Kling though they never came to blows. Kling resolved to buy up the debt of Harding's father, Dr. George Tryon Harding, from land deals. This strategy backfired when Dr. Harding foreclosed on the land and refused to pay Kling. Kling did invest in the new Marion Star building completed in February 1889, largely to make more money from Harding and his father who had gone deeply in debt to build it. Despite threatening to shoot the young man at the courthouse and ruin his newspaper, Kling could not stop his daughter from marrying Harding on July 8, 1891.

Kling continued in his disgust for Harding long after the marriage, essentially ending his relationship with Florence. He pressured other Marion businessmen not to invest in any endeavor Harding partook in. He financed the Republican Transcript to compete with Harding's Marion Star. Harding largely avoided the fray, remarking that Kling "knew how to spend money effectively" when Kling ran for city council. Shortly after returning from Florida, Kling's wife died on June 23, 1893, of peritonitis. When Harding ran for state senate in 1899, Kling unsurprisingly opposed him, spreading the black ancestry myth and attempting to get his friend Mark Hanna involved, ultimately to no avail as Harding won the election.

== Later life and death ==
Kling gradually warmed somewhat to his son-in-law, writing him a letter apologizing for past malice and inviting the Harding couple on European vacations. In 1906, Kling remarried a widow 38 years his junior, Caroline Beatty Denman. In 1907, Kling had a summer home built in Daytona Beach, Florida. He suffered from kidney disease in his later years and became bedridden after an attack in spring 1913. Florence was having her own kidney troubles at the time so Harding visited the old man, who was optimistic about recovery. On October 20, 1913, Kling died. Despite their strained relationship, his daughter received $35,000 and valuable real estate in the will, as well as managing a trust fund for Vetallis. He additionally granted $25,000 to his three grandchildren apiece, $5,000 to brothers George and Donald, and donated $10,000 to the Ladies' Home Association. Since he still counseled Warren against engaging in politics, Kling's death ultimately paved the way for Harding's political rise, first to U.S. Senator and eventually President.
