= Harding Tomb =

Burial location of Warren G. & Florence Harding

- U.S. National Register of Historic Places
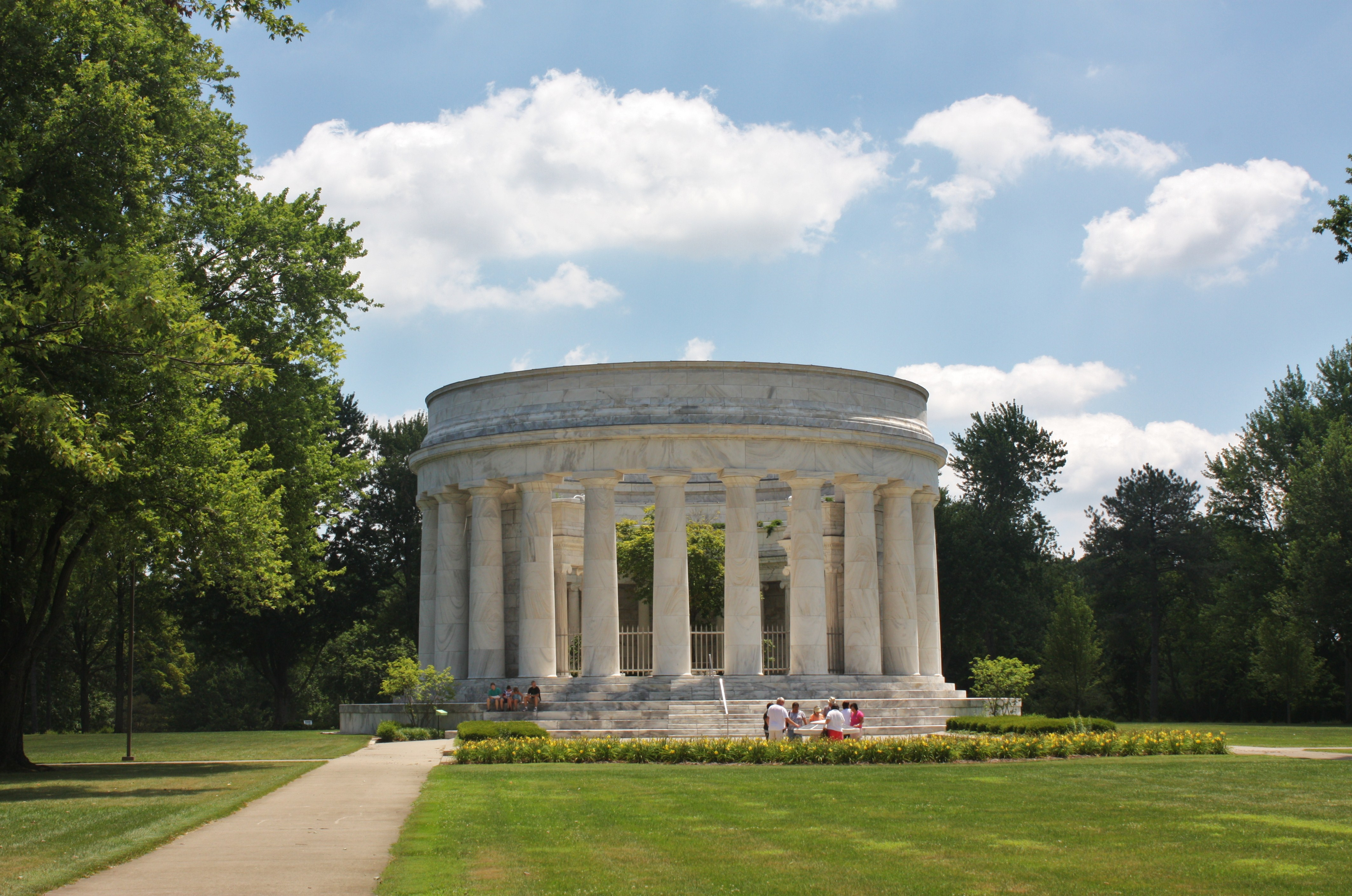
- Front (northern side) of the Harding Tomb

- Location within Ohio Location within the United States
- Interactive map showing Harding Tomb’s location
- Location: Marion Cemetery, Marion, Ohio
- Coordinates: 40°34′23.5″N 83°07′21.8″W
- Area: 2 acres (0.81 ha)
- Built: 1926
- Architect: Henry Hornbostel
- NRHP reference No.: 76001485
- Added to NRHP: June 16, 1976

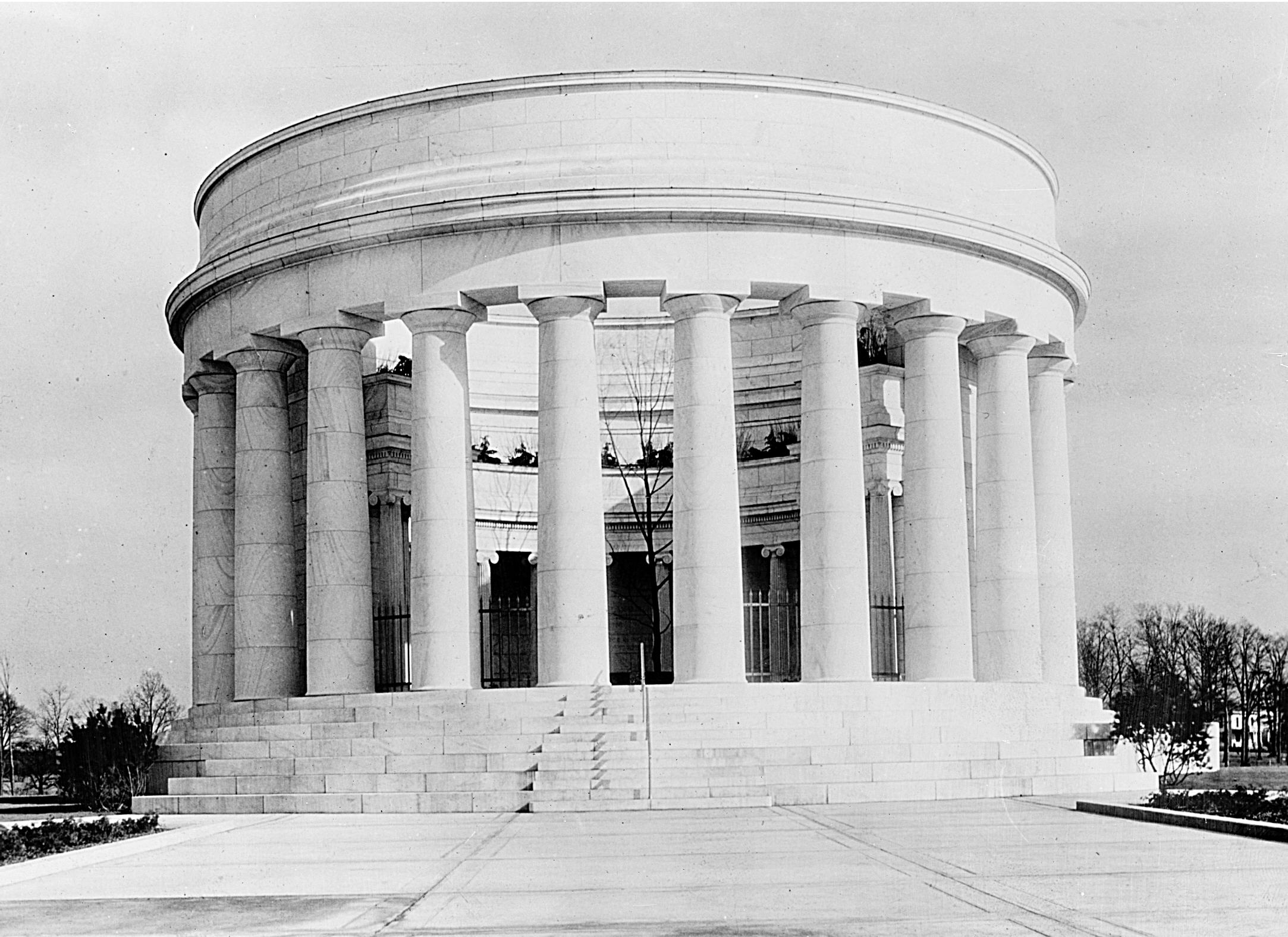
Harding Memorial shortly after completion

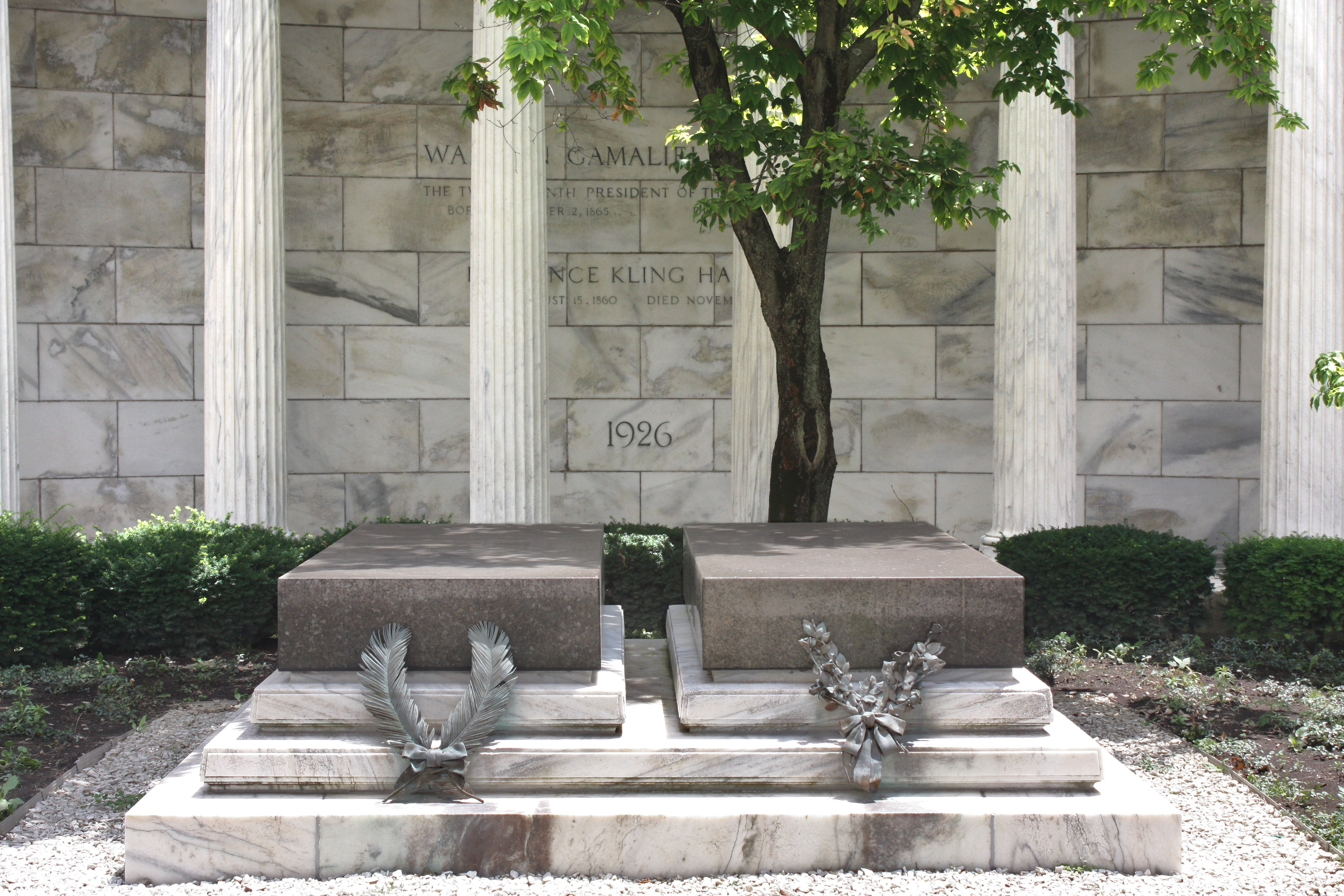
The graves of Warren and Florence Harding, in the center of Harding Tomb.

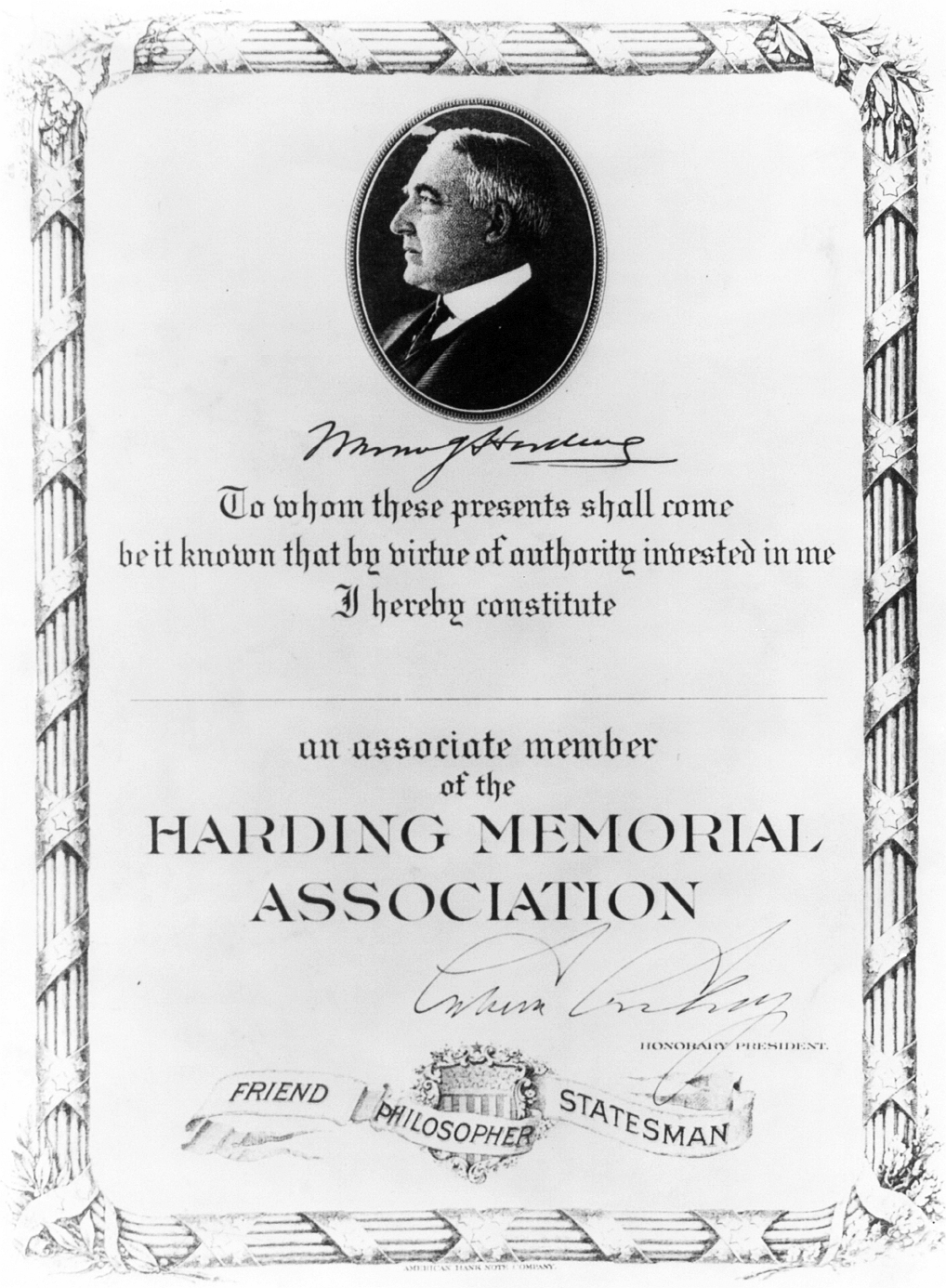
Harding Memorial Association membership certificate, 1923

The Harding Tomb is the burial location of the 29th President of the United States, Warren G. Harding and First Lady Florence Kling Harding. It is located in Marion, Ohio. Also known as the Harding Memorial, it was the last of the elaborate presidential tombs.

== Construction ==
Shortly after Harding died in office, the Harding Memorial Association formed to raise money for a memorial site in honor of the late president. The association ultimately received $978,000 in donations from more than one million people across the country, as well as contributions from several European nations. Among the list of contributors from the United States were an estimated 200,000 school children, who donated pennies towards the memorial. The tomb is located in Marion, Ohio, at the southeast corner of Vernon Heights Boulevard and Delaware Avenue, just south of Marion Cemetery.

== Architecture ==
Construction began in 1926 and finished in the early winter of 1927. It is designed in the style of a circular Greek temple with Doric order marble columns. The columns are built of Georgia white marble and are 28 feet (8.5 m) high and 5 feet (1.5 m) in diameter at the base. Designed by Henry Hornbostel, Eric Fisher Wood and Edward Mellon, the winners of a 1925 national design competition, the structure is 103 feet (31 m) in diameter and 53 feet (16 m) in height.

The structure is unroofed (peribolus), in the style of some Greek temples in which the center (Hypaethros) was open to the sky and without a roof (medium autem sub diva est sine tecto). The open design honors the Hardings' wishes that they be buried outside, and is covered in ivy and other plantings.

== Burials ==
At their deaths, the bodies of the Hardings were entombed in the Marion Cemetery Receiving Vault. Once the Harding Memorial was completed in 1927, the bodies were reinterred in the Memorial's sarcophagus and it was sealed. Because Harding's reputation was damaged by personal controversies and presidential scandals, the Harding Memorial was not officially dedicated until 1931 when President Herbert Hoover presided.

== Dedication ==
On June 16, 1931, President Herbert Hoover gave a speech at the dedication ceremony of the Warren G. Harding memorial. The following are excerpts from Hoover's eulogy:

I DEEM it a privilege to join here in the dedication of the tomb of Warren G. Harding, 29th President of the United States. This beautiful monument, erected by the voluntary subscriptions of the people, symbolizes their respect for his memory. ...

Warren G. Harding came from the people. Born just at the close of the Civil War, it became his responsibility to lead the Republic in a period of reconstruction from another great war in which our democracy had again demonstrated its unalterable resolve to withstand encroachment upon its independence and to deserve the respect of the world. We cannot too often emphasize the difficulties to accomplishment which Warren Harding met in his task. ...

He brought to the Office of President a long experience in public affairs together with the character and spirit of which the Republic was then in need. His was a mind and character fitted for a task where the one transcendent need was the healing quality of gentleness and friendliness. He was inspired by a devoted wife, who gave unstintingly of her strength to aid him. Mrs. Harding rests here beside him in death as she labored beside him in life. ...

Our thoughts today turn to the man himself. My first meeting with Warren Harding ever lingers in my memory. It was during the war and in a time of the greatest strain and anxiety. Late one evening the then-Senator Harding, whom I had never met, came to my office. When he was announced, there flashed into my mind the thought that here was some complaint or a request for some appointment. Instead, the Senator said simply: "I have not come to get anything. I just want you to know that if you wish the help of a friend, telephone me what you want. I am there to serve and to help." That statement, I came to learn, was typical of him. I refer to it now because it reveals the nature of the man. ...

He gave his life in worthy accomplishment for his country. He was a man of delicate sense of honor, of sympathetic heart, of transcendent gentleness of soul – who reached out for friendship, who gave of it loyally and generously in his every thought and deed. He was a man of passionate patriotism. He was a man of deep religious feeling. He was devoted to his fellow men. ...

== Oversight ==
The Harding Memorial Association transferred ownership of the Harding Memorial to the Ohio History Connection (OHC) in March 1979, after passage of state legislation authorizing the takeover. OHS undertook a federally-funded, $538,000 restoration in 1988, and began to refer to the site as the Harding Tomb.

Following a reduction in state funding, the Ohio Historical Society transferred day-to-day management of the tomb and the nearby Harding Home to Marion Technical College (MTC) in April 2010. OHS paid MTC $105,000 a year to run the two sites, achieving a savings of about $60,000 annually. MTC agreed to spend $20,000 in 2010 to help run the site. OHC continues to co-ordinate with MTC on major site issues.

The memorial is the last of the elaborate presidential tombs. This trend began with the burial of President Abraham Lincoln in his tomb in Springfield, Illinois. Since Harding, presidents have chosen burial plot designs that are simpler or combined those with their library sites.

== See also ==
- List of burial places of presidents and vice presidents of the United States
- Presidential memorials in the United States
