= Carrie Fulton Phillips =

American woman, mistress of Warren G. Harding

- Born: Caroline Fulton; September 23, 1873 near Bucyrus, Ohio, U.S.
- Died: February 3, 1960 (aged 86); Marion, Ohio, U.S.
- Known for: The mistress of Warren G. Harding from 1905 until 1920
- Spouse: James Phillips (m. 1896; died 1939)

Caroline "Carrie" Phillips (née Fulton; September 22, 1873 – February 3, 1960) was a mistress of Warren G. Harding, until shortly before he became the 29th President of the United States. The young Carrie Fulton was known by admirers to have epitomized the Gibson Girl portrait of beauty, a look popular at the turn of the 20th century. Her relationship with Senator Warren G. Harding was kept secret from the public during its time and for decades thereafter. The affair ended when Phillips blackmailed Harding during the Senator's run for office for President of the United States.

Phillips was the first woman known to have successfully blackmailed a president of the United States.

== Early life ==
Born September 22, 1873, in Dayton, Ohio, Phillips was the only daughter of Matthew Henry Fulton (1840–1906) and his wife Kate M. Swingly (1851 – after 1873). She had five younger brothers: George Fred, Percy Matthew, James Edward, Thomas Durman, and Chester Courtney Fulton. She was raised by her parents in Bucyrus, Ohio, where her father was a telegraph operator.

Her paternal grandfather, George Washington Fulton (1802–1864), was a successful businessman and engineer active in developing the town of New Brighton, Pennsylvania. George married Mary Ann Kennedy (1812–1887), a sister of Matthew T. Kennedy (1804–1884) and Samuel Kennedy (1810–1886), brothers who established the Kennedy Keg Works first at Fallston, Pennsylvania (1836), and later opened a second operation in New Brighton (1876). George was successful in various ventures, from lumber to real estate, some in connection with his brothers-in-law, with his family reaping the advantages of his success in wealth, comfort, and education.

Carrie married James Phillips in 1896, and the couple moved to Marion where Phillips was co-proprietor of the Uhler-Phillips Company, one of Marion's leading dry goods establishments. The couple quickly established themselves as active members of the local society, in large part due to Phillips’ charm and beauty. Among Phillips's friends and confidants was Florence Harding, wife of the owner and publisher of the city's leading newspaper, The Marion Star.

== Affair with Warren G. Harding ==
James and Carrie had two children, daughter Isabelle (1897–1968) and son James, Jr. (1899–1901). The boy died as a toddler, and, during this time of grief Mrs. Phillips and Warren Harding grew close, despite their respective marriages and friendships. The Phillipses and the Hardings undertook tours of Europe together, all while Phillips and Harding carried on their intimate relationship.

After the affair came to light, Florence Harding, Warren's wife, was furious. She claimed that this was not the first time that her husband had entered into an affair with a woman whom she considered a friend. To separate the two lovers and allow time for the respective marriages to be reconciled, the Phillips family returned to Europe, leaving the Hardings in Marion. While in Germany, Mrs. Phillips became immersed in German culture. She chose to stay in Germany and enrolled their daughter in school there. James Phillips returned to the United States alone.

While Mrs. Phillips was in Europe, Harding ran for the United States Senate. As Europe moved closer to the brink of war, Phillips returned to the United States. Her passion for Germany was very well known. Upon returning to Marion, Phillips' affair with Harding reignited. Phillips reportedly threatened to expose the affair if Harding voted in favor of war with Germany.

In mid-1920, immediately following his acceptance of the Republican Party nomination, Harding disclosed his affair with Mrs. Phillips to Republican Party officials, also disclosing that Phillips was in the possession of hundreds of love letters he had written to her, many on Senate stationery. Reportedly wary of a scandal involving an affair as well as Phillips' support of the German government, the Republican Party urged Mr. and Mrs. Phillips to keep their travels abroad a private matter. Mrs. Phillips responded by dictating terms under which she would consider the party's wishes. In return for Phillips' silence on the matter, the Republican Party offered to pay the way for an extended tour of Asia and the Pacific Islands, as well as an annual stipend to Phillips for the remainder of her life.

== After the affair ==
After Mrs. Harding's death, Mrs. Phillips relocated to Germany. Mr. Phillips died on July 3, 1939, at the age of 73, from heart disease.

Carrie Fulton Phillips died on February 3, 1960, at the age of 86. She was buried in Marion Cemetery, next to her husband and infant son. Their daughter Isabelle and her husband William Helmuth Mathee are also buried in the family plot. Isabelle and Mathee had a son, also named William Helmuth Mathee (1920–1988).

Following Phillips' death, the love letters to Warren Harding became the centerpiece of a court battle that pitted Phillips’ daughter, Isabelle Phillips Mathee, against nephews of Warren G. Harding. In a subsequent legal action, Isabelle Mathee joined the Hardings and received a temporary injunction that prevented historian Francis Russell's inclusion of the material in his 1968 book, The Shadow of Blooming Grove. Ultimately, the court ruled the letters would be sealed until July 2014, at which time their contents would be made public.

The Library of Congress publicly opened the letters between Phillips and Harding on July 29, 2014. The original material is held in the Library of Congress, with copies held at Ohio Historical Society.

== Love letters ==
In 1964, about 1,000 pages of love letters written by Harding to Phillips between 1910 and 1920 were discovered. The letters were written while Harding was Lieutenant Governor of Ohio and subsequently as a sitting US senator. Upon discovery, the letters were sealed and handed over to the Library of Congress on condition that they not be released to the general public for 50 years. On July 29, 2014, 1000 pages of the Harding-Phillips love letters became public. In 2009, the historian and lawyer James Robenalt published a smaller collection of letters, based on microfilm copies located in Cleveland’s Western Reserve Historical Society. This collection has been reproduced in Robenalt’s book, The Harding Affair: Love and Espionage During the Great War.
