= Treaty of Friendship, Commerce and Consular Relations between Germany and the United States of America =

1923 treaty between Germany and the United States

The Treaty of Friendship, Commerce and Consular Relations between Germany and the United States of America was an agreement for the improvement of relations between the U.S. and German governments, signed in Washington, D.C., on December 8, 1923. The U.S. Senate advised and consented to ratify on February 10, 1925. Ratifications were exchanged in Washington on October 14, 1925, and the treaty became effective on the same day. It was registered in League of Nations Treaty Series on August 3, 1926.

== Background ==
Since the U.S. Senate refused to ratify the Treaty of Versailles following the First World War, the U.S. government found itself outside of the inter-Allied arrangements made with the German government. As a result, the U.S. government began its own process of rapprochement with Berlin. As part of that process, a separate U.S.-German peace treaty was concluded in 1921. Following the conclusion of the peace treaty, diplomatic relations between the two governments were reestablished, and on December 10, 1921, the new U.S. ambassador, Ellis Loring Dresel, presented his credentials in Berlin.

In late 1923, German economy collapsed under the burden of reparations, and the U.S. government viewed this as a new opportunity to improve relations in order to strengthen the German position. As a result, the friendship treaty was concluded.

== Terms of the Treaty ==
Article 1 permitted the free travel and economic and cultural activities by U.S. nationals in Germany and German nationals in the United States. Article 2 allowed nationals of each party in the other country to sue for damages caused. Article 3 guaranteed from illegal search business facilities in each of the two countries owned by nationals from the other. Article 4 guaranteed the right of inheritance for nationals of each countries of property located in the other. Article 5 guaranteed freedom of religion for national of each country residing in the other. Article 6 permitted each of the parties to draft to its army nationals of the other country in times of war. Article 7 guaranteed favourable trade conditions for nationals of each of the parties in the other country. Article 8 provided for equality in taxation for nationals of the other party. Articles 9–11 provided for equal treatment for ships of the other party. Articles 12-15 dealt with trade provisions. Article 16 provided for the right of transit for nationals of each of the parties in the territories of the other party. Articles 17-28 regulated the work of Consuls. Article 29 included the Panama Canal within U.S. territories open to German citizens. Article 30 stipulated that nothing in the treaty can contradict the provisions of the US-German peace treaty concluded in 1921. Article 31 provided the treaty shall remain in force for ten years and will be prolonged for another year each time, unless denounced by either of the parties. Article 32 provided for ratification of the treaty and its entry into effect upon exchange of ratifications.

== Aftermath ==
The treaty was in operation between the U.S. and the German governments until after Hitler's rise to power. On July 11, 1928, the U.S. government served a note of continuation regarding the treaty to the Secretariat of the League of Nations. Following Hitler's rise to power, relations were worsening, and on June 3, 1935, a new agreement was signed between the U.S. and German governments, which limited the operation of article 7 of the treaty, dealing with freedom of commercial activities by national of both countries.

On December 11, 1941, Hitler declared war on the United States, and all treaties between the two countries became inoperative.

The validity of the treaty in view of the surrender of the German government in 1945 was questioned in the U.S. Supreme Court in Clark v. Allen. The case was about a woman named Alvina Wagner, who died in California in 1942 and bequeathed her estate to her relatives who were German nationals at the time. The property was seized by the Custodian of Enemy Property, but some of her relatives in California petitioned to the court on grounds that they were the rightful heirs, claiming that the outbreak of war nullified the stipulations in the agreement regarding the right of inheritance between nationals of the two countries contained in article 4. The Supreme Court, in a ruling delivered in 1947, eventually granted the petitioners part of the property, while leaving part of it to the Custodian. In its final ruling, the court stated: "the outbreak of war does not necessarily suspend or abrogate treaty provisions. (- - -) We do not think that the national policy expressed in the Trading with the Enemy Act, as amended, is incompatible with the right of inheritance granted German aliens under Article IV of the treaty". However, the Court demonstrated some caution by stating: "It is not for them (the courts in the US) to denounce treaties generally, en bloc. Their part it is, as one provision or another is involved in some actual controversy before them, to determine whether, alone, or by force of connection with an inseparable scheme, the provision is inconsistent with the policy or safety of the nation in the emergency of war, and hence presumably intended to be limited to times of peace". It also recognized in part the powers of the Custodian of Enemy Property to represent the interest of the heirs and thus dispose of the estate. On this issue the court stated: "For the power to vest (i.e. confiscate enemy property) is discretionary, not mandatory". Eventually, the court refused to rule generally whether the treaty's validity survived the outbreak of war, and stated: "We have no reliable evidence of the intention of the high contracting parties outside the words of the present treaty. The attitude and conduct under earlier treaties, reflecting as they did numerous contingencies and conditions, leave no sure guide to the construction of the present treaty. Where the relevant historical source and the instrument itself give no plain indication that it is to become inoperative in whole or in part on the outbreak of war, we are left to determine, as Techt v. Hughes, supra, indicates, whether the provision under which rights are asserted is incompatible with national policy in time of war. So far as the right of inheritance of realty under Article IV of the present treaty is concerned, we find no incompatibility with national policy, for reasons already given". The court also referred to the question whether the surrender of the Third Reich in 1945 and the partition of Germany into occupation zones nullified the operation of the treaty, by stating: "We find no evidence that the political departments have considered the collapse and surrender of Germany as putting an end to such provisions of the treaty as survived the outbreak of the war or the obligation of either party in respect to them. The Allied Control Council has, indeed, assumed control of Germany's foreign affairs and treaty obligations - a policy and course of conduct by the political departments wholly consistent with the maintenance and enforcement, rather than the repudiation, of pre-existing treaties".

On October 29, 1954, a new Treaty of Friendship was signed between the U.S. and West German governments. Article XXVIII of the new treaty stated as follows: "The present Treaty shall replace and terminate provisions in force in Articles I through V, VII through XVI, and XXIX through XXXII, of the treaty of friendship, commerce and consular rights between the United States of America and Germany, signed Washington December 8, 1923".

== See also ==
- U.S.–German Peace Treaty (1921)
