= U.S.–Austrian Peace Treaty (1921) =

1921 treaty between the United States and Austria

Treaty of Peace between Austria and the United States of America
- Signed: 24 August 1921
- Location: Vienna, Austria
- Effective: 8 November 1921
- Condition: Ratification by Austria and the United States
- Signatories: (United States) Arthur Hugh Frazier; (First Austrian Republic) Johannes Schober
- Parties: United States; Austria
- Citations: 42 Stat. 1946, TS 659, 5 Bevans 215, 7 LNTS 156

Full text
- US - Austria Peace Treaty at Wikisource

The U.S.–Austrian Peace Treaty is a peace treaty between the United States and Austria, signed in Vienna on August 24, 1921, in the aftermath of the First World War. This separate peace treaty was required because the United States Senate refused to advise and consent to the ratification of the multilateral Treaty of Saint-Germain-en-Laye of 1919.

Ratifications were exchanged in Vienna on November 8, 1921, and the treaty became effective on the same day. The treaty was registered in League of Nations Treaty Series on November 22, 1921.

== Background ==
During the First World War, Austria – which formed the nucleus of the Austro-Hungarian Empire – was defeated by the Allied Powers, one of which was the United States of America. The US government declared war on Austria-Hungary on December 7, 1917. At the end of the war in 1918, Austria-Hungary disintegrated and Austria was established as an independent republic.

In 1919, the victorious Allied Powers held a peace conference in Paris to formulate peace treaties with the defeated Central Powers. At the conference, a peace treaty with the Austrian government was concluded. Although the US government was among the signatories of that treaty, the Senate refused to ratify the treaty due to opposition to joining the League of Nations.

As a result, the two governments started negotiations for a bilateral peace treaty not connected to the League of Nations. Such a treaty was concluded on August 24, 1921.

== Terms of the treaty ==
Article 1 obliged the Austrian government to grant to the US government all rights and privileges enjoyed by the other Allied Powers who ratified the St. Germain treaty.

Article 2 specified which articles of the St. Germain treaty shall apply to the United States.

Article 3 provided for the exchange of ratifications in Vienna.

== Aftermath ==
The treaty laid the foundations for a US-Austrian cooperation not under the strict supervision of the League of Nations. As a result, the US government embarked on a path of partially assisting the government of the Austrian Republic to ease the burden of war reparations imposed in the Treaty of St. Germain.

The treaty was supplemented by a treaty signed in Washington on November 26, 1924, which provided for the establishment of a mixed US-Austrian-Hungarian commission to decide amount of reparations to be paid by the Austrian and Hungarian governments to the US.

== See also ==
- Treaty of Saint-Germain-en-Laye (1919)
- U.S.–German Peace Treaty (1921)
- U.S.–Hungarian Peace Treaty (1921)
- Agreement Regarding the Restoration of the State of Peace between Germany and China (1921)

== Notes ==
- 42 Stat. 1946
- Treaty Series 659
- 5 Bevans 215
- 7 LNTS 156
