= Shandong Problem =

1919-21 dispute over colonial concessions in east China

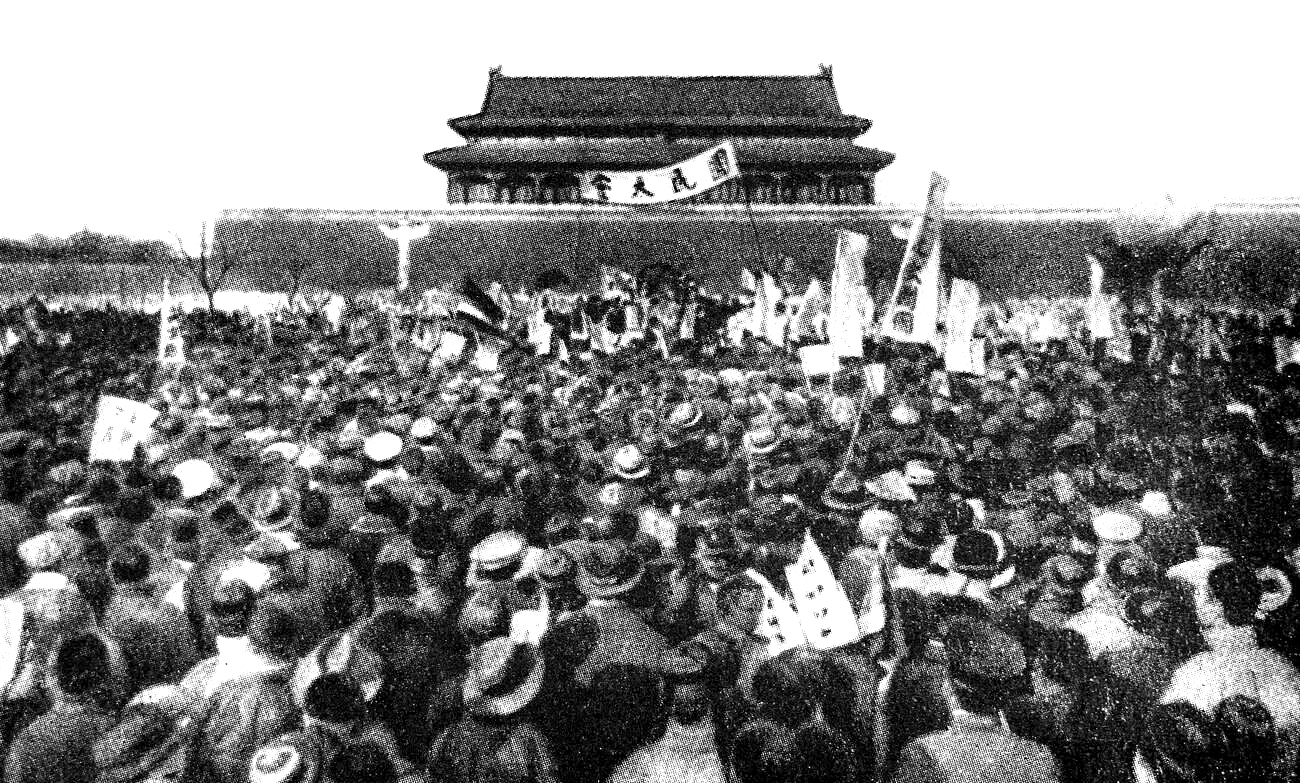
Tiananmen Square on 4 May 1919. Around 3,000 students from 13 universities in Beijing gathered there to oppose Article 156 of the Treaty of Versailles which handover a German possession in China to Japan (Shandong Problem). This officially sparked the May Fourth Movement.

The Shandong Problem or Shandong Question (Note: Shandong was then romanized as Shantung.) (simplified Chinese: 山东问题; traditional Chinese: 山東問題; pinyin: Shāndōng wèntí; Japanese: 山東問題, romanized: Santō mondai) was a dispute over Article 156 of the Treaty of Versailles in 1919, which dealt with the concession of the Shandong Peninsula. It was resolved in China's favor in 1922.

== Background ==
The German Empire acquired control over parts of Shandong following a series of events in the late 19th century. The key moment came in 1897 when two German missionaries were murdered in the province. Using this incident as a pretext, Germany demanded concessions from China. In 1898, China agreed to lease the Kiautschou Bay Leased Territory, which included the port city of Qingdao, to Germany for ninety-nine years. This lease was formalized in the Kiautschou Bay Leased Territory agreement. The agreement granted Germany significant rights and control over the region, allowing them to build infrastructure, such as railways and telegraph lines, and establish a military presence.

During the First World War (1914–1918), China supported the Allies on condition that the Kiautschou Bay concession on the Shandong peninsula, which had belonged to the German Empire prior to its occupation by Japan in 1914, would be returned to China. In 1915, however, China under President and later self-proclaimed Emperor Yuan Shikai reluctantly capitulated to 13 of Japan's original Twenty-One Demands which, among other things, acknowledged Japanese control of former German holdings. Britain and France promised Japan it could keep these holdings. In late 1918, China's warlord Premier Duan Qirui secretly reaffirmed the transfer and accepted payments from Japan, causing a massive scandal after its exposure. Article 156 of the Treaty of Versailles transferred the territory of Kiautschou as well as the rights, titles and privileges acquired by virtue of the Sino-German treaty of 1898 to the Empire of Japan rather than return them to the Chinese administration.

The new government of China denounced the transfer of German holdings at the Paris Peace Conference in 1919, with the strong support of President Woodrow Wilson of the United States. The Chinese ambassador to the United States, Wellington Koo, stated that China could no more relinquish Shandong, which was the birthplace of Confucius, the greatest Chinese philosopher, than could Christians concede Jerusalem. While he demanded the promised return of Shandong, it remained in Japanese control. Chinese popular outrage over Article 156 led to demonstrations on 4 May 1919, in a cultural and political movement called the May Fourth Movement. The widespread protests and boycotts pressured the Chinese government to reconsider its stance on the Treaty of Versailles. Although the treaty was eventually signed, the movement set the stage for further negotiations. As a result, Wellington Koo refused to sign the treaty. The US, finding itself isolated by all Great Powers, agreed to the Japanese, British and French demands. The Chinese public became outraged by the eventual treaty, accusing the Chinese government of selling out, and became disappointed by Wilson's failed promises.

China's refusal to sign the Treaty of Versailles necessitated a separate peace treaty with Germany in 1921. The Shandong dispute was mediated by the United States in 1922 during the Washington Naval Conference. In a victory for China, the Japanese leasehold on Shandong was returned to China in June, 1922. Japan, however, maintained its economic dominance of the railway and the province as a whole. When its dominance in the province was threatened by Chiang Kai-shek's Northern Expedition to unite China in 1927–1928, Japan launched a series of military interventions, culminating in the Jinan incident conflict with Chinese Nationalist soldiers. Jinan would remain under Japanese occupation until March 1929, when an agreement to settle the dispute over Jinan was reached. Shandong remained in the sphere of influence of Japan, arguably, until the end of the Japanese occupation of China during the Second World War in 1945.

== See also ==
- Sino-German cooperation (1926–1941)
- Treaty of Versailles
- Paris Peace Conference
