= U.S.–German Peace Treaty (1921) =

1921 treaty between the United States and Germany

US–Germany Peace Treaty
Treaty of Peace between the United States of America and Germany
- Type: Peace treaty
- Signed: 25 August 1921
- Location: Berlin, Germany
- Effective: 11 November 1921
- Condition: Ratification by Germany and the United States
- Signatories: (United States) Ellis Loring Dresel; (Weimar Republic) Friedrich Rosen
- Parties: United States; Germany
- Citations: 42 Stat. 1939, TS 658, 8 Bevans 145, 12 LNTS 192
- Languages: German, English

Full text
- US - Germany Peace Treaty at Wikisource

The U.S.–German Peace Treaty was a peace treaty between the United States and the German governments. It was signed in Berlin on August 25, 1921 in the aftermath of World War I. The main reason for the conclusion of the treaty was that the U.S. Senate did not consent to ratification of the multilateral peace treaty signed in Versailles, thus leading to a separate peace treaty. Ratifications were exchanged in Berlin on November 11, 1921, and the treaty became effective on the same day. The treaty was registered in League of Nations Treaty Series on August 12, 1922.

== Background ==
During World War I, the German Empire was defeated by the Allied Powers, one of which was the United States. The U.S. government declared war on Germany on April 6, 1917. At the end of the war in November 1918, the German monarchy was overthrown and Germany was established as a republic.

In 1919, the victorious Allied Powers held a peace conference in Paris to formulate peace treaties with the defeated Central Powers. At the conference, a peace treaty with the German government was concluded. The U.S. government was among the signatories of the treaty, but the U.S. Senate refused to ratify it, due in large measure to its objections to U.S. participation in the League of Nations.

As a result, the two governments started negotiations for a bilateral peace treaty not connected to the League of Nations. On July 2, 1921, U.S. President Warren G. Harding signed the Knox–Porter Resolution, which had been passed by the U.S. Congress and ended the state of war between the U.S. and Germany, Austria and Hungary, further setting the stage for bilateral peace treaties. The treaty between the U.S. and Germany, formally titled the "Treaty between the United States and Germany Restoring Friendly Relations" was signed in Berlin on August 25, 1921. The United States Senate advised ratification on October 18, 1921 and the treaty was ratified by President Harding on October 21, 1921. The treaty was ratified by Germany on November 2, 1921, and ratifications exchanged in Berlin on November 11, 1921.

== Terms ==
Article 1 obliged the German government to grant to the U.S. government all rights and privileges that were enjoyed by the other Allies that had ratified the peace treaty signed in Paris.

Article 2 specified the articles of the Versailles Treaty that applied to the U.S.

Article 3 provided for the exchange of ratifications in Berlin.

== Aftermath ==
The treaty laid the foundations for an American-German co-operation that was not under the strict supervision of the League of Nations. As a result, the U.S. government embarked on a path of partially assisting the government of the Weimar Republic to ease the burden of war reparations imposed in the Treaty of Versailles. Following the conclusion of the peace treaty, diplomatic relations between the two governments were reestablished, and on December 10, 1921, the new U.S. chargé d'affaires, Ellis Loring Dresel, presented his credentials in Berlin.

The treaty was supplemented by a treaty signed in Berlin on August 10, 1922 that provided for the establishment of an American-German commission to decide the amount of reparations to be paid by the German government to the U.S.

To commemorate the signing of both this treaty and the U.S.–Austrian Peace Treaty, the Morgan silver dollar (whose mintage had resumed earlier in the year following a 17-year absence due to a silver bullion shortage) was retired in favor of the new Peace dollar design (just over one million Peace dollars were minted in December 1921, compared with more than 86 million Morgan dollars earlier in that same year), which continued to be minted through 1928, with a resumption in 1934 and 1935.

== See also ==
- U.S.–Austrian Peace Treaty (1921)
- U.S.–Hungarian Peace Treaty (1921)
- Agreement Regarding the Restoration of the State of Peace between Germany and China (1921)
- Treaty of Friendship, Commerce and Consular Relations between Germany and the United States of America
