= Ellis Loring Dresel =

American diplomat

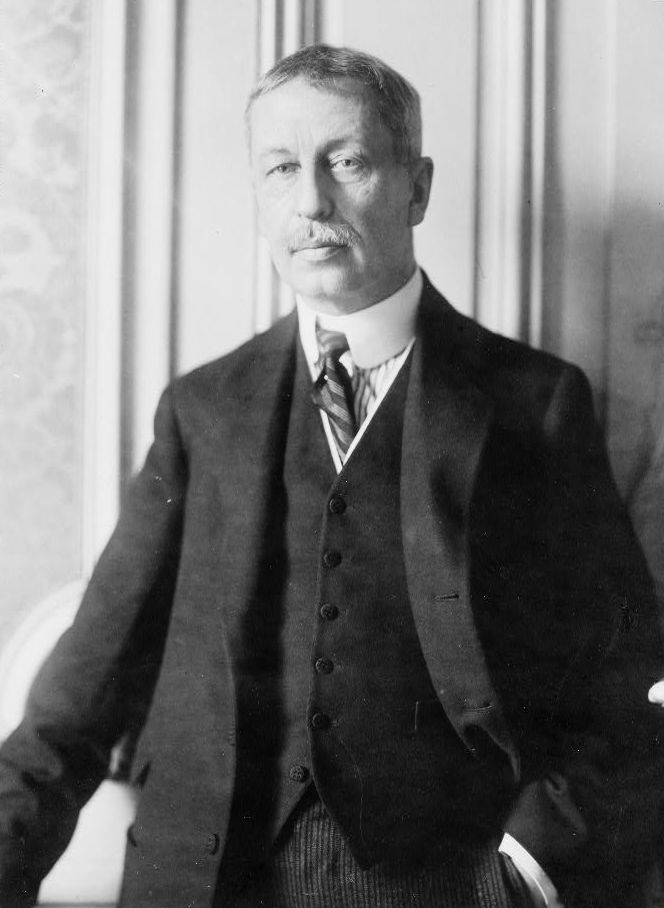
- Dresel, circa 1920.

United States Ambassador to Germany
- Acting, as chargé d'affaires
- In office December 10, 1921 – April 18, 1922
- President: Warren G. Harding
- Preceded by: James W. Gerard (1917)
- Succeeded by: Alanson B. Houghton

Personal details
- Born: Ellis Loring Dresel; November 28, 1865 Boston, Massachusetts, US
- Died: September 19, 1925 (aged 59) Prides Crossing, Massachusetts, US
- Resting place: Beverly Central Cemetery, Beverly, Massachusetts
- Parent: Otto Dresel (father)
- Relatives: Ellis Gray Loring (grandfather)
- Education: Harvard University (B.A., LL.B.)
- Occupation: Lawyer, diplomat

Ellis Loring Dresel (November 28, 1865 – September 19, 1925) was an American lawyer and diplomat. During World War I, from 1915 to 1917, Dresel was attaché to the U.S. embassy in Berlin. After the war, Dresel signed the peace treaty with Germany, and served as chargé d'affaires for a few months, before retiring from the Foreign Service altogether.

== Biography ==
The son of German pianist and composer Otto Dresel and Anna Loring, Ellis Dresel was born in Boston on November 28, 1865. He had one sibling, a sister Louisa. His maternal grandfather, Ellis Gray Loring, was an abolitionist and one of the founders of the New England Anti-Slavery Society. He graduated from Harvard College in 1887 and from Harvard Law School in 1892. He was fluent in French and German. He practiced law with the firm of Goodwin, Dresel and Parker in Boston and lived there on Beacon Street for most of his life. He also served as a director of Corbin Copper and Silver Mining Company. He belonged to several private clubs and, with his sister as hostess, gave a cotillion at Christmas 1906 at the New Algonquin Club.

He was in Europe when World War I broke out in 1915 and he volunteered his services to the U.S. embassy in Berlin, first helping Americans stranded in Germany. After being forced to leave Berlin when the United States entered the war, he handled the affairs of the U.S. embassy in Vienna until the United States and the Austro-Hungarian Empire broke off diplomatic relations. He was responsible for relations between the German government and British prisoners of war from 1917 to 1918. During that time, in Bern, Dresel also worked with the American Red Cross, the American Legation, and its War Trade Board.

Dresel led the political information section of the Paris Peace Conference in 1919. From 1919 to 1921, he was the United States commissioner to Germany where he promoted the public presence of the United States with annual Fourth of July celebrations. He signed the treaty that concluded hostilities between the United States and Germany and restored their diplomatic relations on November 11, 1921.

Dresel was the first American diplomatic observer to visit Germany after World War I.

In 1921, his title was changed to chargé d'affaires. The following year, though President Warren G. Harding was prepared to name him ambassador to Germany, he left government service and returned to the United States. Harvard awarded him an honorary degree of Master of Arts in 1922 in recognition of his diplomatic service.

Dresel suffered from heart problems even while in the diplomatic service. He died of cancer on September 19, 1925, in Pride's Crossing, Massachusetts. He was buried in Beverly Central Cemetery in Beverly, Massachusetts.

== Legacy ==
He never married. He belonged to the Episcopal Church. Years later, a group of Harvard graduates established a fund in his honor.

Dresel's papers are preserved in the Houghton Library, including correspondence with William Richards Castle, Joseph Clark Grew, Hugh S. Gibson, Henry Cabot Lodge, and Allen Welsh Dulles.

Diplomatic posts
| Preceded by James W. Gerard | United States Ambassador to Germany; 1921-1922 | Succeeded by Alanson B. Houghton |
