= Otto Dresel =

German-born American pianist and composer

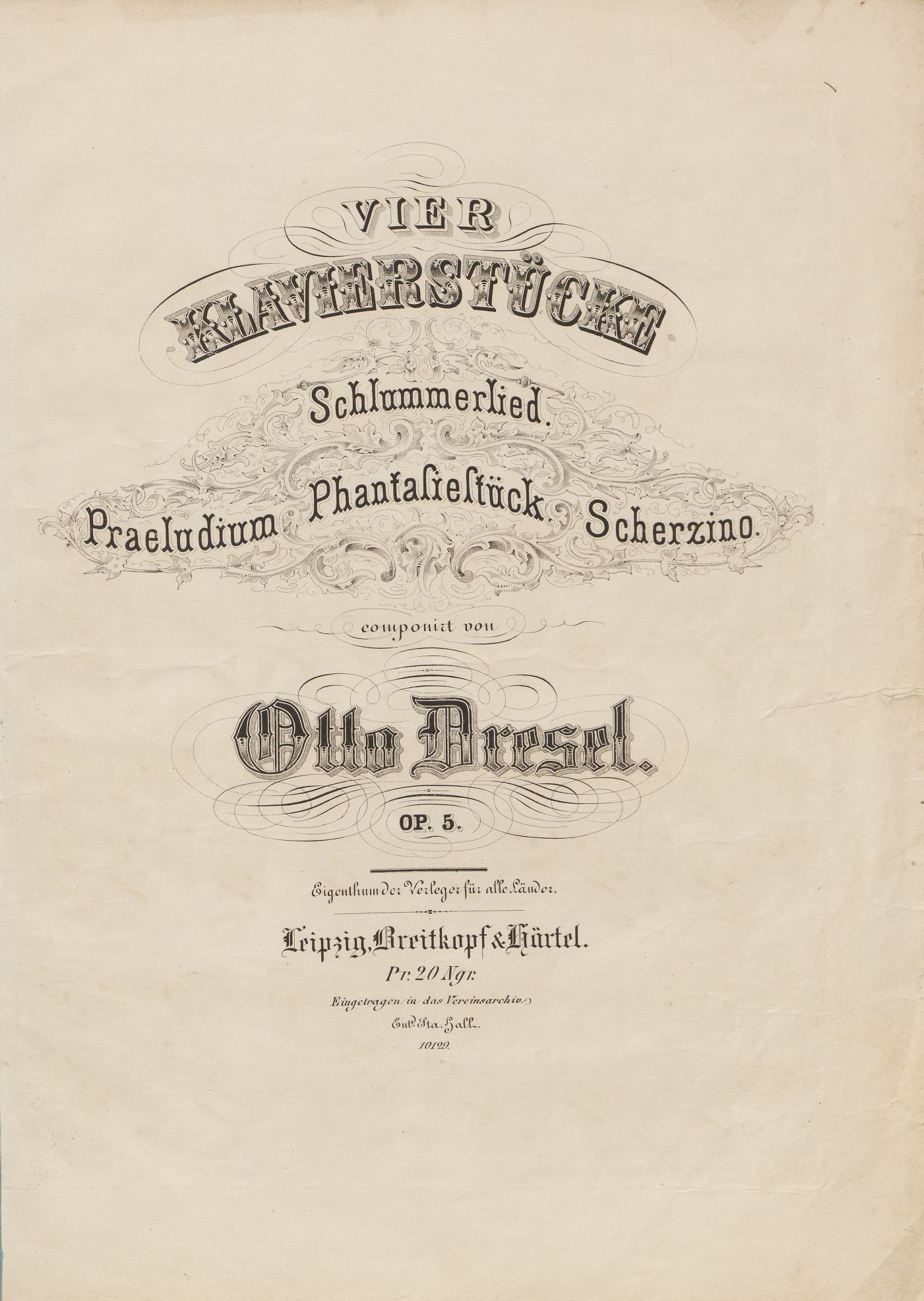
Vier Klavierstücke (1861), Otto Dresel

Otto Dresel (December 20, 1826 – July 26, 1890) was an American pianist, music teacher and composer of German birth.

== Biography ==
Born in Geisenheim in the Duchy of Nassau, he studied with Moritz Hauptmann in Leipzig, and received guidance from Ferdinand Hiller and Felix Mendelssohn. Between 1846 and 1848 he wrote two chamber works, a piano trio and a piano quartet. He came to the United States in 1848. His participation in the revolutions of 1848 in Germany were a factor in this decision. And after 1848, faster and safer steamers encouraged European musicians, especially those from Germany, to come to the United States to teach and perform. In New York City, Dresel joined Theodore Eisfeld in presenting concerts.

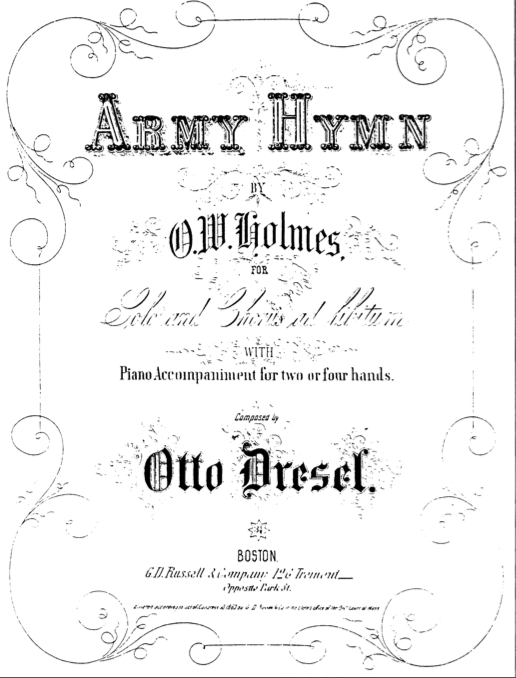
Cover of Dresel's "Army Hymn," text by Oliver Wendell Holmes (Boston: G. D. Russell, 1863)

In 1852 he moved to Boston, Massachusetts, where he lived until his death in Beverly, Massachusetts. He married Anna Loring (1830–1896), daughter of Ellis Gray Loring, an abolitionist and a founder of the New England Anti-Slavery Society, on October 29, 1863. They had two children, Louisa Loring Dresel (1864–195-) and Ellis Loring Dresel (1865–1925), an attorney and diplomat.

He was well known as a pianist in Boston. He composed mainly chamber music and songs, as well as larger-scale settings of poems by Henry Wadsworth Longfellow and Oliver Wendell Holmes for soloists with orchestra.

Dresel concentrated his energies on the selecting the highest quality music for his performances, and he eschewed displays of facile brilliance as were emphasized by musicians such as Europeans like Henri Herz and Sigismond Thalberg and the American Louis Moreau Gottschalk. He fostered the appreciation of Bach and Handel in the United States, and was a vigorous promoter of the songs of his friend and colleague Robert Franz.

== Compositions ==
- David Francis Urrows, Otto Dresel: Collected Vocal Music (Middleton, WI: A-R Editions, 2002) (Note: "A Critical edition of the songs and other vocal works of German-American composer Otto Dresel (1826-90), most published for the first time. With an extensive biographical and critical essay on Dresel and his Lieder, as well as full texts with translations and notes of the poems and their sources. An appendix contains 19th C. reviews of the songs' early publications; and a further note discusses the Doppelgaenger, Friedrich Otto Dresel (1824-81)")
- David Francis Urrows, Otto Dresel: Chamber Works (Middleton, WI: A-R Editions, 2009)
  - Piano Trio in A Minor
  - Piano Quartet in F Major

== Additional sources ==
- William F. Apthorp, "Two Modern Classicists in Music" Part I, The Atlantic, vol. 72, October 1893, pp. 488–503. [Dresel and Franz]
- William F. Apthorp, "Two Modern Classicists in Music" Part II, The Atlantic, vol. 72, November 1893, pp. 638–49. [Dresel and Franz]
- John Tasker Howard, Our American Music: Three Hundred Years of It (NY: Thomas Y. Crowell Company, 1939)
- David Francis Urrows. "Apollo in Athens: Otto Dresel and Boston, 1850-90," American Music, Vol. 12, No. 4 (Winter, 1994), pp. 345–388
