= U.S.–Hungarian Peace Treaty =

1921 treaty between the United States and Hungary

US–Hungary Peace Treaty
Treaty of Peace between the United States of America and Hungary
- Signed: August 29, 1921
- Location: Budapest, Hungary
- Effective: December 17, 1921
- Condition: Ratification by Hungary and the United States.
- Signatories: (United States) Ulysses Grant-Smith; (Kingdom of Hungary (1920–1946)) Miklós Bánffy
- Parties: United States; Kingdom of Hungary
- Citations: 42 Stat. 1951, TS 660, 8 Bevans 982, 48 LNTS 191
- Languages: Hungarian, English, French

Full text
- US - Hungary Peace Treaty at Wikisource

The U.S.–Hungarian Peace Treaty is a peace treaty between the United States and the Kingdom of Hungary, signed in Budapest on August 29, 1921, in the aftermath of the First World War. This separate peace treaty was required because the United States Senate refused to ratify the multilateral Treaty of Trianon.

Ratifications were exchanged in Budapest on December 17, 1921, and the treaty became effective on the same day. The treaty was registered in the League of Nations Treaty Series on May 8, 1926.

== Background ==
During the First World War, Hungary—which formed part of the nucleus of the Austro-Hungarian Empire—was defeated by the Allied Powers, one of which was the United States of America. The U.S. government declared war on Austria-Hungary on December 7, 1917. At the end of the war in 1918, Austria-Hungary disintegrated and Hungary was established as a democratic republic, to be replaced by a regency in search of a king in early 1920.

In 1919, the victorious Allied Powers held a peace conference in Paris to formulate peace treaties with the defeated Central Powers. At the conference, a peace treaty with the Hungarian government was concluded. Although the US government was among the signatories of that treaty, the Senate refused to ratify the treaty due to opposition to joining the League of Nations.

As a result, the two governments started negotiations for a bilateral peace treaty not connected to the League of Nations. Such a treaty was concluded on August 29, 1921.

== Terms of the treaty ==
Article 1 obliged the Hungarian government to grant to the US government all rights and privileges enjoyed by the other Allied Powers who ratified the peace treaty signed in Paris.

Article 2 specified which articles of the Trianon treaty shall apply to the United States.

Article 3 provided for the exchange of ratifications in Budapest.

== Aftermath ==
The treaty laid the foundations for a U.S.–Hungarian cooperation not under the strict supervision of the League of Nations. As a result, the U.S. government embarked on a path of partially assisting the government of Hungary to ease the burden of war reparations imposed in the Treaty of Trianon.

The treaty was supplemented by a treaty signed in Washington on November 26, 1924, which provided for the establishment of a mixed U.S.–Austrian–Hungarian commission to decide amount of reparations to be paid by the Austrian and Hungarian governments to the U.S.

== See also ==
- Treaty of Trianon
- US-German Peace Treaty (1921)
- US-Austrian Peace Treaty (1921)
