= Paris Peace Conference (1919–1920) =

Meeting of the Allied Powers after World War I

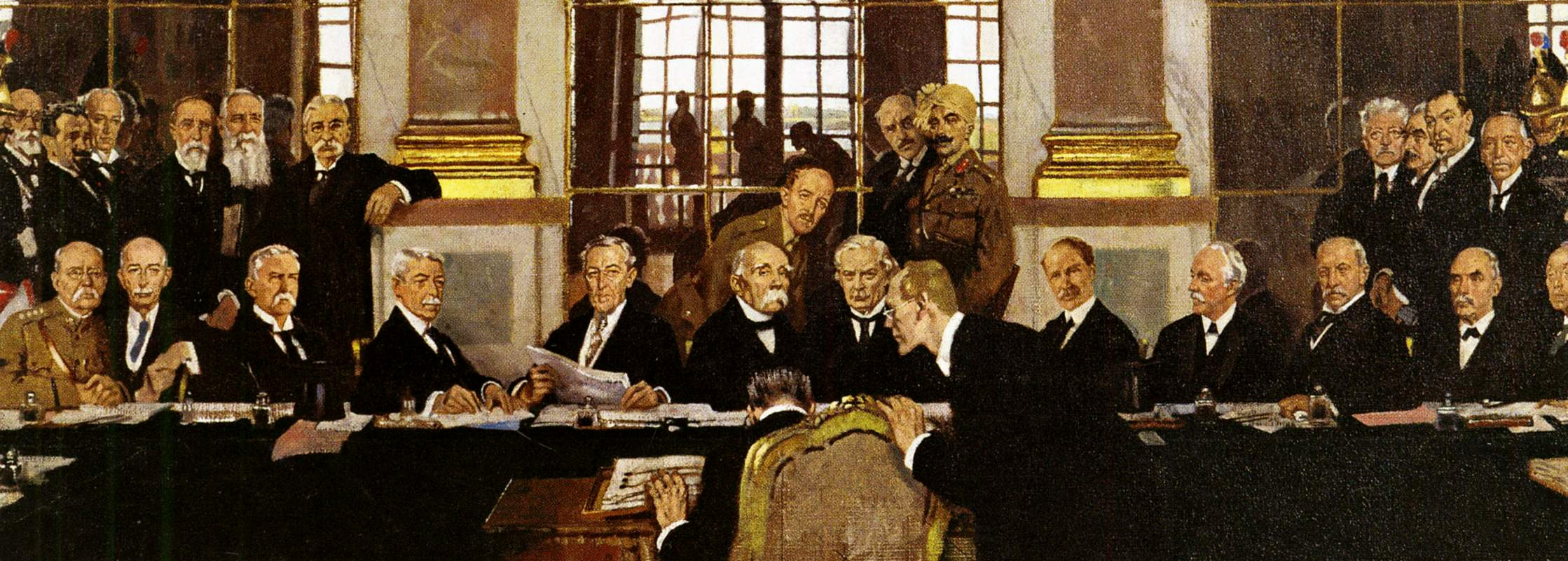
Johannes Bell of Germany is shown signing the peace treaties on 28 June 1919 in The Signing of Peace in the Hall of Mirrors, by Sir William Orpen.

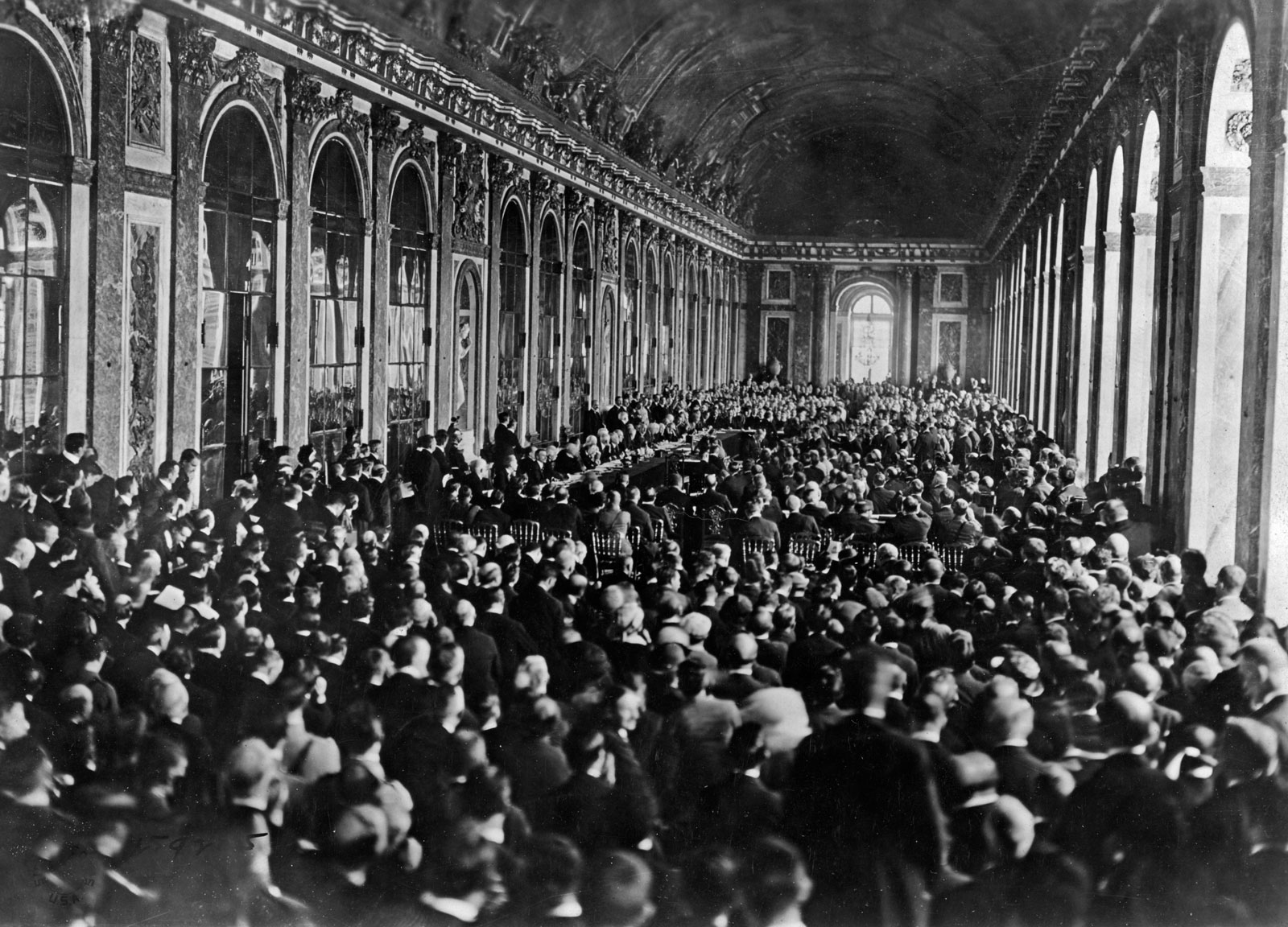
Dignitaries gathering in the Hall of Mirrors at the Palace of Versailles, France, to sign the Treaty of Versailles

The Paris Peace Conference was a set of formal and informal diplomatic meetings in 1919 and 1920 after the end of World War I, in which the victorious Allies set the peace terms for the defeated Central Powers. Dominated by the leaders of Britain, France, the United States and Italy, the conference resulted in five treaties that rearranged the maps of parts of Europe, Asia, Africa and the Pacific Islands, and also imposed financial penalties. Germany, Austria-Hungary, Turkey and Bulgaria (the losing nations) were not given a voice in the deliberations; this later gave rise to political resentments that lasted decades. Russia (but not its actual government) was represented. The arrangements made by this conference are considered one of the greatest watersheds of 20th century geopolitical history which would lead to World War II.

The conference involved diplomats from 32 countries and nationalities. Its major decisions were the creation of the League of Nations and the five peace treaties with the defeated states. Main arrangements agreed upon in the treaties were, among others, the transition of German and Ottoman overseas possessions as "mandates" from the hands of these countries chiefly into the hands of Britain and France; the imposition of reparations upon Germany; and the drawing of new national boundaries, sometimes involving plebiscites, to reflect ethnic boundaries more closely.

US president Woodrow Wilson in 1917 commissioned a group of about 150 academics to research topics likely to arise in diplomatic talks on the European stage, and to develop a set of principles to be used for the peace negotiations to end World War I. The results of this research were summarized in the so-called Fourteen Points document that became the basis for the terms of the German surrender during the conference, as it had earlier been the basis of the German government's negotiations in the Armistice of 11 November 1918.

The main result of the conference was the Treaty of Versailles with Germany; Article 231 of that treaty placed the responsibility for the war on "the aggression of Germany and her allies". That provision proved very humiliating for German leaders, armies and citizens alike, and set the stage for the expensive reparations that Germany was intended to pay, only a small portion of which had been delivered when it stopped paying after 1931. The five great powers at that time, France, Britain, Italy, Japan and the United States, controlled the Conference. The "Big Four" leaders were French prime minister Georges Clemenceau, British prime minister David Lloyd George, US president Woodrow Wilson, and Italian prime minister Vittorio Emanuele Orlando. Together with teams of diplomats and jurists, they met informally 145 times and agreed upon all major decisions before they were ratified.

The conference began on 18 January 1919. With respect to its end, Professor Michael Neiberg noted, "Although the senior statesmen stopped working personally on the conference in June 1919, the formal peace process did not really end until July 1923, when the Treaty of Lausanne was signed." The entire process is often referred to as the "Versailles Conference", although only the signing of the first treaty took place in the historic palace; the negotiations occurred at the Quai d'Orsay in Paris.

== Overview and direct results ==
The location of the signing of the five principal treaties within the Île de France region

The Conference formally opened on 18 January 1919 at the Quai d'Orsay in Paris. This date was symbolic, as it was the anniversary of the proclamation of William I as German Emperor in 1871, in the Hall of Mirrors at the Palace of Versailles, shortly before the end of the Siege of Paris – a day itself imbued with significance in Germany, as the anniversary of the establishment of the Kingdom of Prussia in 1701. The Delegates from 27 nations (delegates representing 5 nationalities were for the most part ignored) were assigned to 52 commissions, which held 1,646 sessions to prepare reports, with the help of many experts, on topics ranging from prisoners of war to undersea cables, to international aviation, to responsibility for the war. Key recommendations were included in the Treaty of Versailles with Germany, which had 15 chapters and 440 clauses, as well as treaties for the other defeated nations.

The five major powers, France, Britain, Italy, the United States, and Japan, controlled the Conference. Amongst the "Big Five", in fact Japan only sent a former prime minister and played a small role; and the "Big Four" leaders dominated the conference. The four met together informally 145 times and made all the major decisions, which were then ratified by other attendees. The open meetings of all the delegations approved the decisions made by the Big Four. The conference came to an end on 21 January 1920, with the inaugural General Assembly of the League of Nations.

Five major peace treaties were prepared at the Paris Peace Conference, with, in parentheses, the affected countries:

- the Treaty of Versailles, 28 June 1919 (Germany)
- the Treaty of Saint-Germain, 10 September 1919 (Austria)
- the Treaty of Neuilly, 27 November 1919 (Bulgaria)
- the Treaty of Trianon, 4 June 1920 (Hungary)
- the Treaty of Sèvres, 10 August 1920; subsequently revised by the Treaty of Lausanne, 24 July 1923 (Ottoman Empire/Republic of Turkey).

The major decisions were the establishment of the League of Nations; the five peace treaties with defeated enemies; the awarding of German and Ottoman overseas possessions as "mandates", chiefly to members of the British Empire and to France; reparations imposed on Germany; and the drawing of new national boundaries, sometimes with plebiscites, to better reflect the forces of nationalism. The main result was the Treaty of Versailles, which, in section 231, assigned to Germany the liability for damages caused to the Allies by "the aggression of Germany and her allies" This provision proved humiliating for Germany and set the stage for significant reparations Germany was supposed to pay. Germany paid only a small portion before reparations ended in 1931. According to British historian A. J. P. Taylor the treaty seemed to Germans "wicked, unfair" and "dictation, a slave treaty" but one that they would repudiate at some stage if it "did not fall to pieces of its own absurdity."

As the conference's decisions were enacted unilaterally and largely on the whims of the Big Four, Paris was effectively the center of a world government during the conference, which deliberated over and implemented the sweeping changes to the political geography of Europe.

The League of Nations proved controversial in the United States since critics said it subverted the powers of the US Congress to declare war. The US Senate did not ratify any of the peace treaties, so the United States never joined the League. Instead, the 1921–1923 Harding administration concluded new treaties with Germany, Austria, and Hungary. The German Weimar Republic was not invited to attend the conference at Versailles. Representatives of White Russia, but not Communist Russia, were at the conference. Numerous other nations sent delegations to appeal for various unsuccessful additions to the treaties, and parties lobbied for causes ranging from independence for the countries of the South Caucasus to Japan's unsuccessful proposal for racial equality to the other great powers.

== Mandates ==
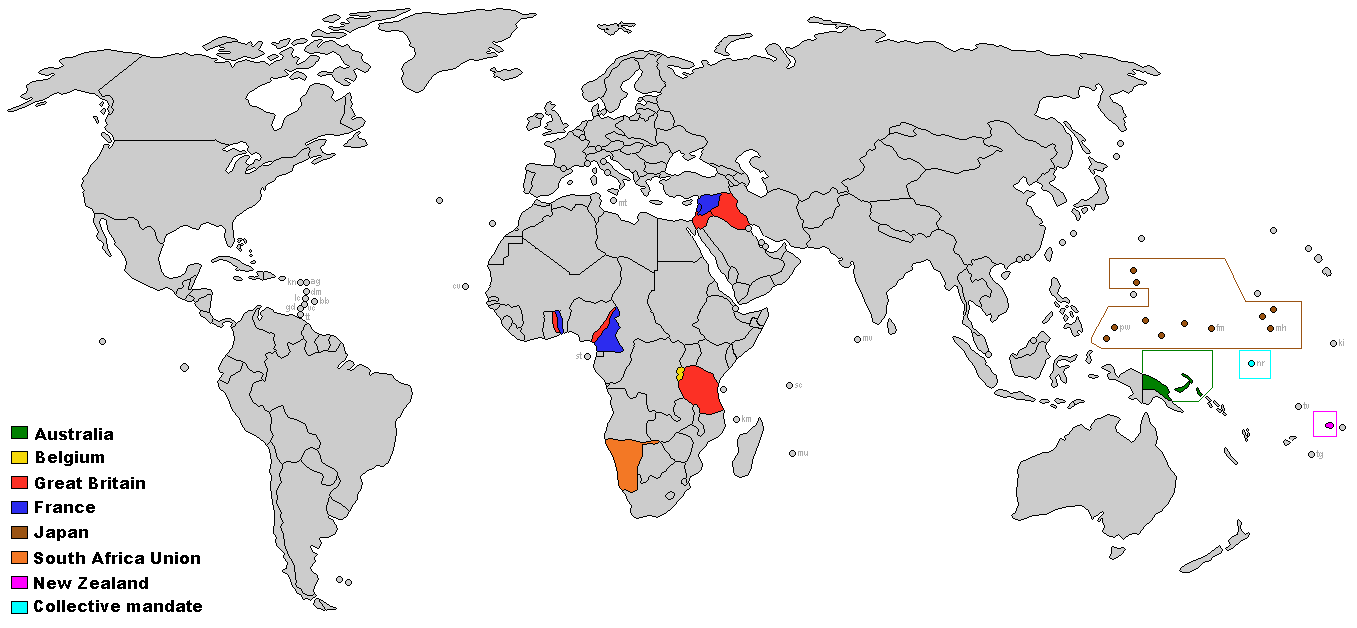
Mandates of the League of Nations

A central issue of the conference was the disposition of the overseas colonies of Germany (Austria-Hungary did not have major colonies, and the Ottoman Empire was a separate issue).

Some British dominions wanted their reward for their sacrifice. Australia wanted New Guinea, New Zealand wanted Samoa, and South Africa wanted South West Africa. Wilson wanted the League to administer all German colonies until they were ready for independence. Lloyd George realized that he needed to support his dominions, so he proposed a compromise: There would be three types of mandates.

Mandates for the Turkish provinces were one category and would be divided up between Britain and France. The second category, of New Guinea, Samoa, and South West Africa, were located so close to responsible supervisors that the mandates could hardly be given to anyone except Australia, New Zealand, and South Africa. Finally, the African colonies would need the careful supervision as "Class B" mandates, which could be provided only by experienced colonial powers: Britain, France, and Belgium, although Italy and Portugal received small amounts of territory. Wilson and the others finally went along with the solution. The dominions received "Class C Mandates" to the colonies that they wanted. Japan obtained mandates over German possessions north of the Equator.

Wilson wanted no mandates for the United States, but his main advisor, Colonel House, was deeply involved in awarding the others. Wilson was especially offended by Australian demands and had some memorable clashes with Billy Hughes (the Australian prime minister), this the most famous:

Wilson: "But after all, you speak for only five million people."
Hughes: "I represent sixty thousand dead."

== British approach ==
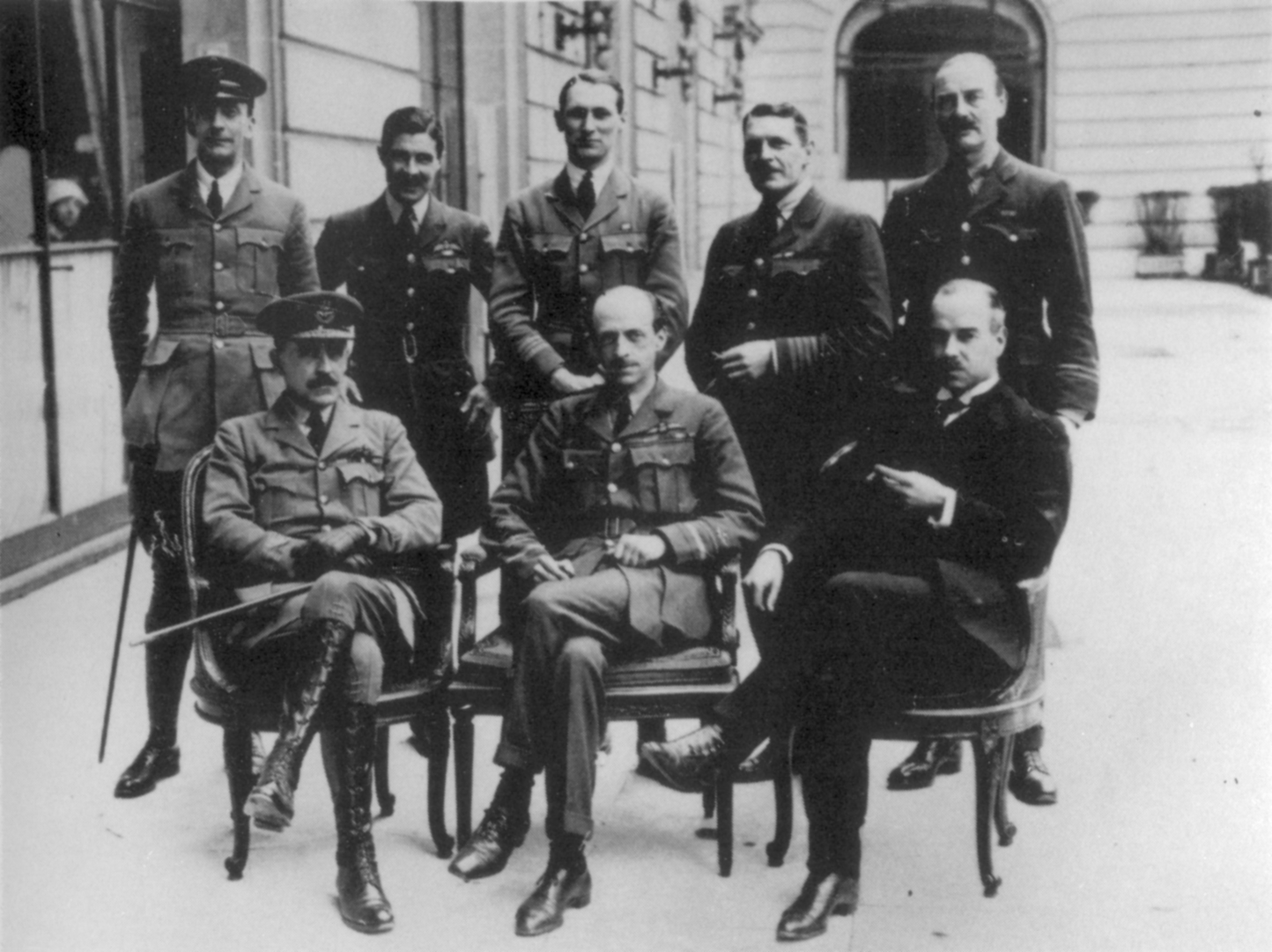
The British Air Section at the conference

The maintenance of the unity, territories, and interests of the British Empire was an overarching concern for the British delegates to the conference. Still, they entered the conference with more specific goals with this order of priority:

- Ensure colonial claims of Germany were redacted (taken or given to victory colonies)
- Germany was ensued with 30 billion dollars of debt, concerning interest
- Ensuring the security of France
- Removing the threat of the German High Seas Fleet
- Settling territorial contentions
- Supporting the League of Nations

The Racial Equality Proposal put forth by the Japanese did not directly conflict with any core British interest, but as the conference progressed, its full implications on immigration to the British dominions, with Australia taking particular exception, became a major point of contention within the delegation.

Ultimately, the British delegation did not treat that proposal as a fundamental aim of the conference; they were willing to sacrifice the Racial Equality Proposal to placate the Australian delegation and thus help to satisfy their overarching aim of preserving the unity of the British Empire.

Britain had reluctantly consented to the attendance of separate delegations from British dominions, but the British managed to rebuff attempts by the envoys of the newly proclaimed Irish Republic to put a case to the conference for Irish self-determination, diplomatic recognition, and membership in the proposed League of Nations. The Irish envoys' final "Demand for Recognition" in a letter to Clemenceau, the conference chairman, was not answered. Britain had been planning to renege on the Government of Ireland Act 1914 and instead to replace it with a new Government of Ireland Bill that would partition Ireland into two Irish Home Rule states (which eventually was passed as the Government of Ireland Act 1920). The planned two states would both be within the United Kingdom, and so neither would have dominion status.

=== Eastern Mediterranean ===
Like the other main Allied powers, the British public was more inclined to punish Germany and Austria. Britain's relationship with the Ottoman Empire was not a topic in the 1918 general election. There was an indecision among British decision makers over defanging and demobilizing the Ottoman army, the fate to be assigned to leading Committee of Union and Progress members, and the future of the Turkish straits. Per Taner Akçam, the considerations of British envoys to Versailles were:

1. Securing Britain's link to India
2. Avoiding friction with France
3. The long-standing policy of supporting the Ottoman Empire was no longer sensible
4. An Eastern Mediterranean ally had to fill the security vacuum the Ottoman Empire left to contain a resurgent Russian threat

A strong Greece, Armenia, and fortified Palestine were all reflections of this sentiment.

=== Dominion representation ===
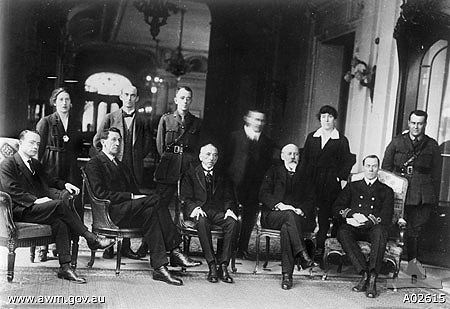
The Australian delegation, with Australian Prime Minister Billy Hughes in the center

The dominion governments were not originally given separate invitations to the conference and had been expected to send representatives as part of the British delegation.

Convinced that Canada had become a nation on the battlefields of Europe, Prime Minister Sir Robert Borden demanded that it have a separate seat at the conference. That was initially opposed not only by Britain but also by the United States, which saw any Dominion delegation as an extra British vote. Borden responded by pointing out that since Canada had lost nearly 60,000 men, a far larger proportion of its men than the 50,000 American men lost, it had at least the right to the representation of a "minor" power. Lloyd George eventually relented and persuaded the reluctant Americans to accept the presence of delegations from Australia, Canada, India, New Zealand, and South Africa, and that those countries receive their seats in the League of Nations. India was given separate representation despite being a non-self-governing colony, while Newfoundland was the only Dominion denied representation due to American objections over its small size.

Canada, despite its huge losses in the war, did not ask for either reparations or mandates.

The Australian delegation, led by Australian Prime Minister Billy Hughes fought greatly for its demands: reparations, the annexation of German New Guinea, and the rejection of the Racial Equality Proposal. He said that he had no objection to the proposal if it was stated in unambiguous terms that it did not confer any right to enter Australia. He was concerned by the increasing power of Japan. Within months of the declaration of war in 1914, Japan, Australia, and New Zealand had seized all of Germany's possessions in the Far East and the Pacific Ocean. The British had given their blessing for Japan to occupy German possessions, but Hughes was alarmed by that policy.

== French approach ==
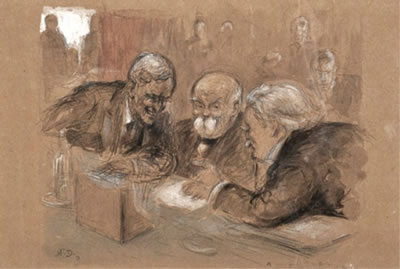
Woodrow Wilson, Georges Clemenceau, and David Lloyd George confer at the Paris Peace Conference (Noël Dorville, 1919)

French prime minister Georges Clemenceau controlled his delegation, and his chief goal was to weaken Germany militarily, strategically, and economically. Having personally witnessed two German attacks on French soil in the last 50 years, he was adamant Germany should not to be permitted to attack France again. Particularly, Clemenceau sought an American and British joint guarantee of French security in the event of another German attack.

Clemenceau also expressed skepticism and frustration with Wilson's Fourteen Points and complained: "Mr. Wilson bores me with his fourteen points. Why, God Almighty has only ten!" Wilson gained some favour by signing a mutual defense treaty with France, but he did not present it to his country's government for ratification and so it never took effect.

Another possible French policy was to seek a rapprochement with Germany. In May 1919 the diplomat René Massigli was sent on several secret missions to Berlin. During his visits, he offered, on behalf of his government, to revise the territorial and economic clauses of the upcoming peace treaty. Massigli spoke of the desirability of "practical, verbal discussions" between French and German officials that would lead to a "Franco-German collaboration."

Massigli told the Germans that the French thought of the "Anglo-Saxon powers" (the United States and the British Empire) as the major threat to France in the post-war world. He argued that both France and Germany had a joint interest in opposing "Anglo-Saxon domination" of the world, and he warned that the "deepening of opposition" between the French and the Germans "would lead to the ruin of both countries, to the advantage of the Anglo-Saxon powers."

The Germans rejected Massigli's offers because they believed that the intention was to trick them into accepting the Treaty of Versailles unchanged; also, the German Foreign Minister, Count Ulrich von Brockdorff-Rantzau, thought that the United States was more likely to reduce the severity of the penalties than France was. (Lloyd George was the one who eventually pushed for better terms for Germany.)

== Italian approach ==
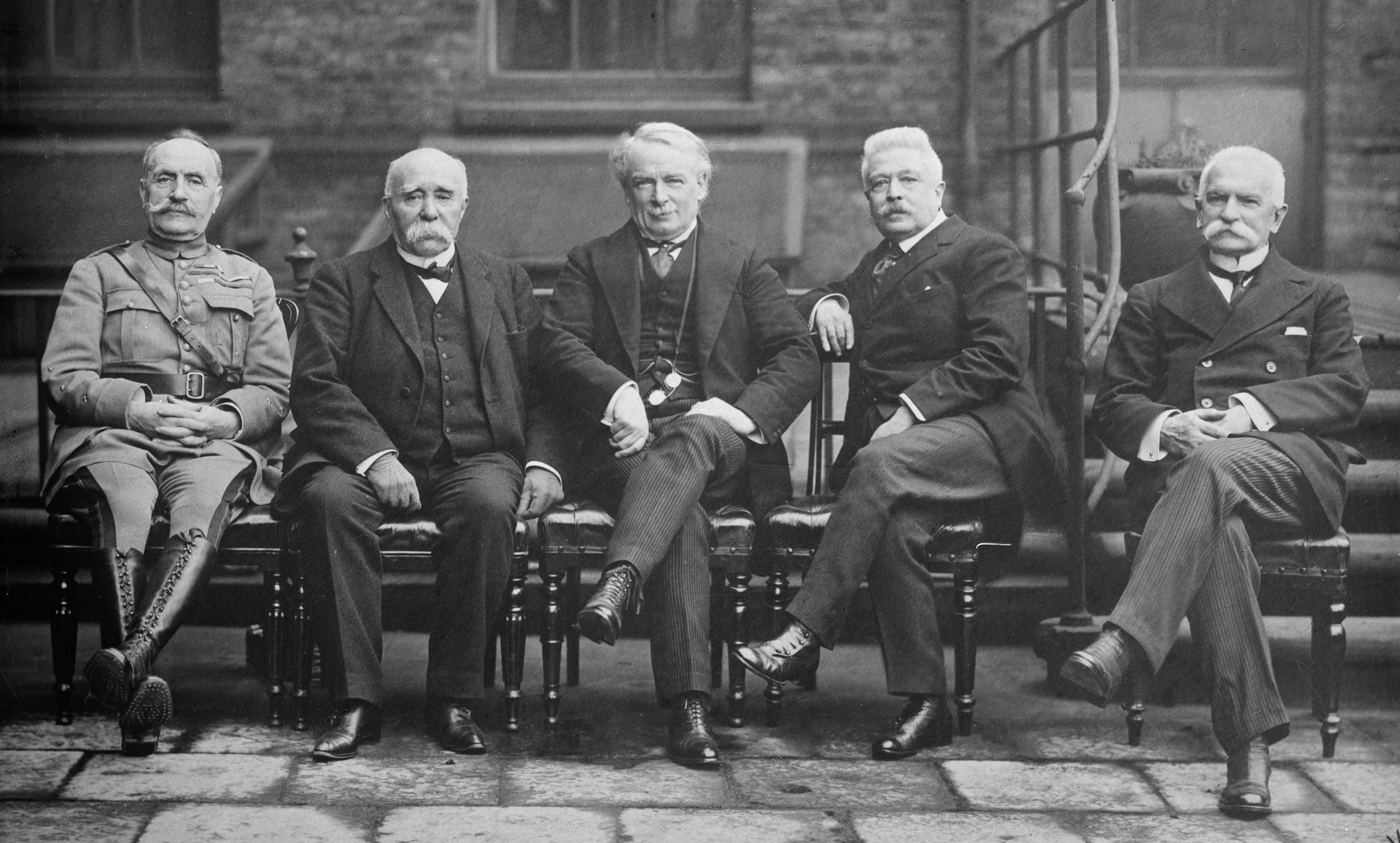
From left to right: Marshal Ferdinand Foch, Clemenceau, Lloyd George and the Italians Vittorio Emanuele Orlando and Sidney Sonnino

In 1914, Italy remained neutral despite the Triple Alliance with Germany and Austria-Hungary. In 1915, it joined the Allies to gain the territories promised by the Triple Entente in the secret Treaty of London: Trentino, the Tyrol as far as Brenner, Trieste, Istria, most of the Dalmatian Coast (except Fiume), Valona, a protectorate over Albania, Antalya (in Turkey), and possibly colonies in Africa.

Italian prime minister Vittorio Emanuele Orlando tried to obtain full implementation of the Treaty of London, as agreed by France and Britain before the war. He had popular support because of the loss of 700,000 soldiers and a budget deficit of 12,000,000,000 Italian lire during the war made both the government and people feel entitled to all of those territories and even others not mentioned in the Treaty of London, particularly Fiume, which many Italians believed should be annexed to Italy because of the city's Italian population.

Orlando, unable to speak English, conducted negotiations jointly with his Foreign Minister Sidney Sonnino, a Protestant of British origins who spoke the language. Together, they worked primarily to secure the partition of the Habsburg monarchy. At the conference, Italy gained Istria, Trieste, Trentino, and South Tyrol. Most of Dalmatia was given to the Kingdom of Serbs, Croats and Slovenes. Fiume remained disputed territory, causing a nationalist outrage.

Orlando obtained other results, such as the permanent membership of Italy in the League of Nations and the promise by the Allies to transfer British Jubaland and the French Aozou strip to Italian colonies. Protectorates over Albania and Antalya were also recognized, but nationalists considered the war to be a mutilated victory, and Orlando was ultimately forced to abandon the conference and to resign. Francesco Saverio Nitti took his place and signed the treaties.

There was a general disappointment in Italy, which the nationalists and fascists used to build the idea that Italy was betrayed by the Allies and refused what had been promised. That was a cause for the general rise of Italian fascism. Orlando refused to see the war as a mutilated victory and replied to nationalists calling for a greater expansion, "Italy today is a great state... on par with the great historic and contemporary states. This is, for me, our main and principal expansion."

== Japanese approach ==
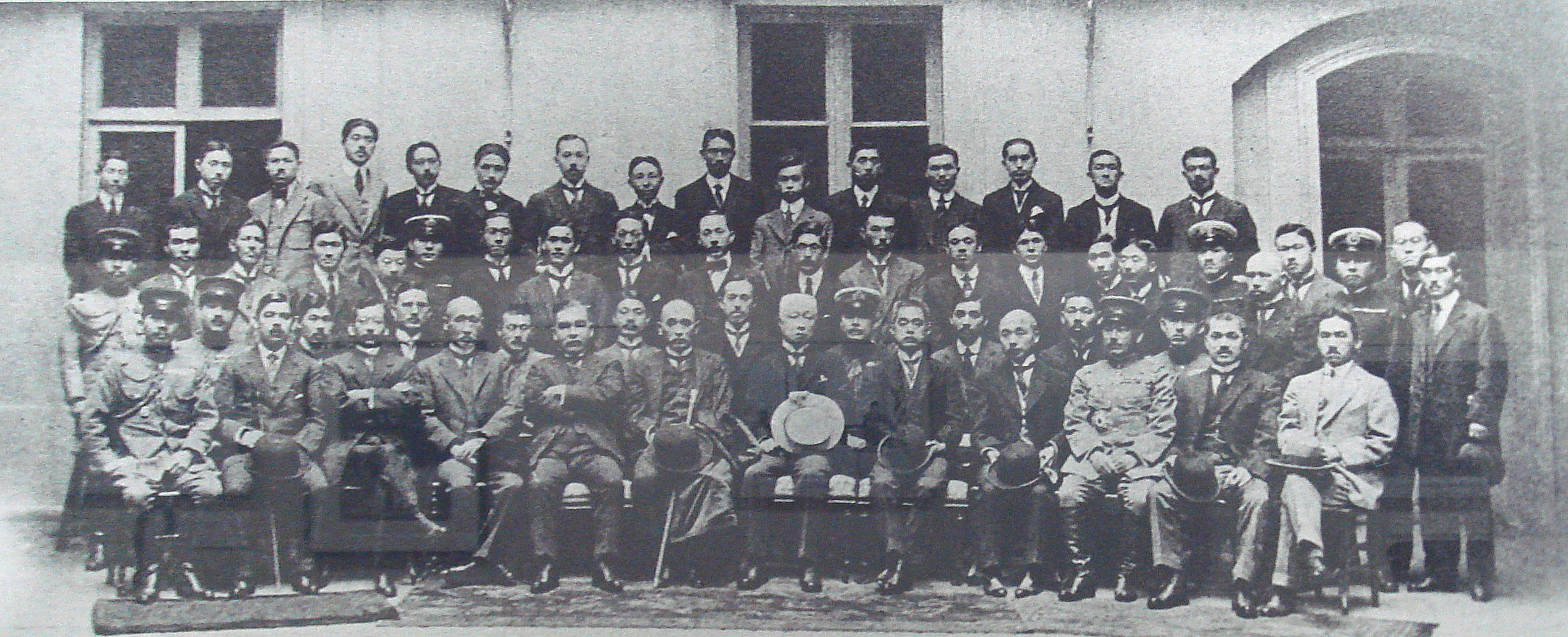
The Japanese delegation at the Paris Peace Conference

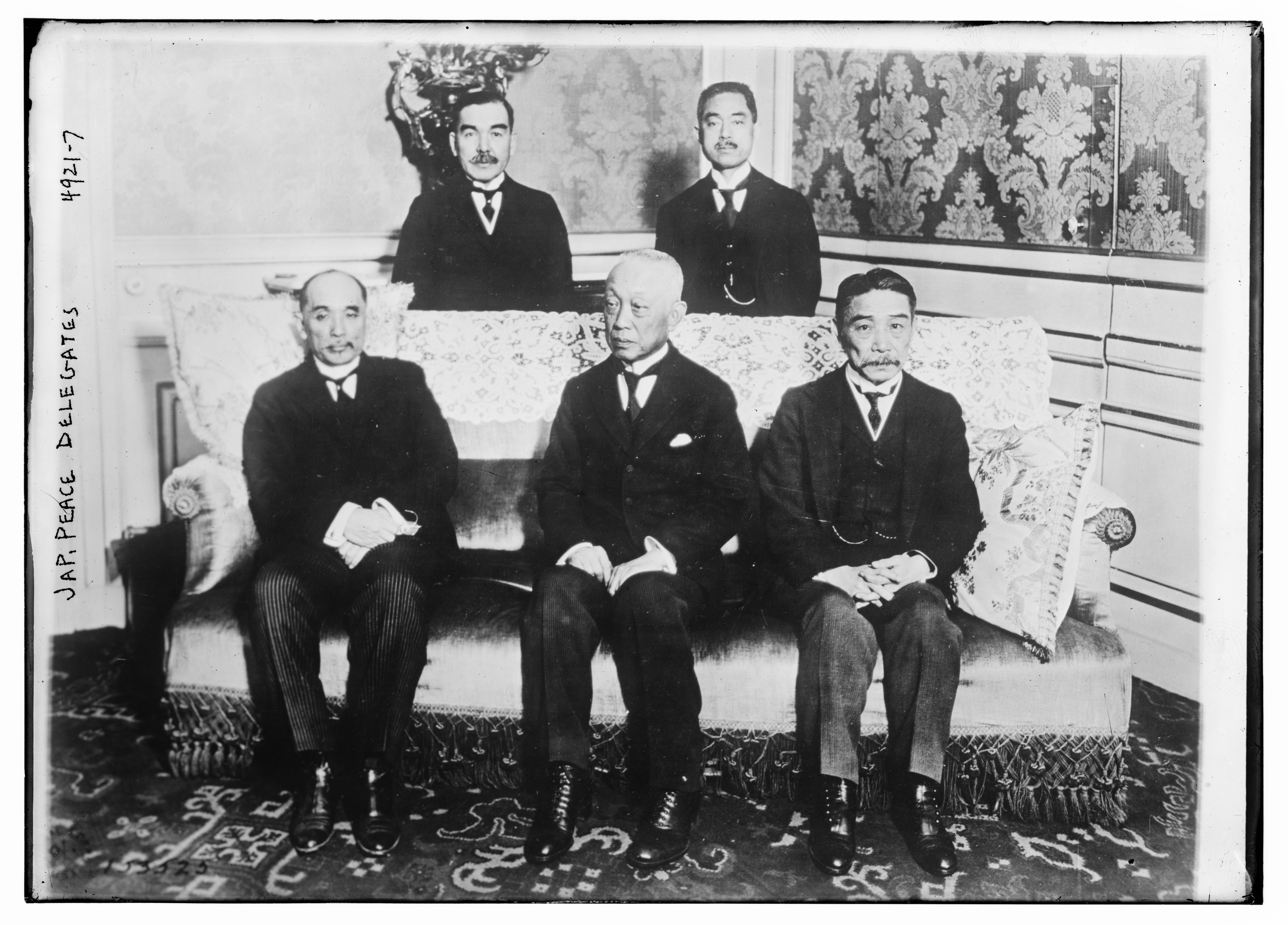
The Japanese delegation at the Conference, with (seated left to right) former Foreign Minister Baron Makino Nobuaki, former prime minister Marquis Saionji Kinmochi, and Japanese Ambassador to Great Britain Viscount Chinda Sutemi

Japan sent a large delegation, headed by the former prime minister, Marquis Saionji Kinmochi. It was originally one of the "big five" but relinquished that role because of its slight interest in European affairs. Instead, it focused on two demands: the inclusion of its Racial Equality Proposal in the League's Covenant and Japanese territorial claims with respect to former German colonies: Shantung (including Kiaochow) and the Pacific islands north of the Equator, the Marshall Islands, Micronesia, the Mariana Islands, and the Carolines.

The former Foreign Minister Baron Makino Nobuaki was de facto chief. Saionji's role was symbolic and limited because of his history of ill-health. The Japanese delegation became unhappy after it had received only half of the rights of Germany, and it then walked out of the conference.

=== Racial equality proposal ===
During the negotiations, the leader of the Japanese delegation, Saionji Kinmochi, proposed the inclusion of a "racial equality clause" in the Covenant of the League of Nations on 13 February as an amendment to Article 21:

The equality of nations being a basic principle of the League of Nations, the High Contracting Parties agree to accord as soon as possible to all alien nationals of states, members of the League, equal and just treatment in every respect making no distinction, either in law or in fact, on account of their race or nationality.

The clause quickly proved problematic to both the American and British delegations. Though the proposal itself was compatible with Britain's stance of nominal equality for all British subjects as a principle for maintaining imperial unity, there were significant deviations in the stated interests of its dominions, notably Australia and South Africa. Though both dominions could not vote on the decision individually, they were strongly opposed to the clause and pressured Britain to do likewise. Ultimately, the British delegation succumbed to imperial pressure and abstained from voting for the clause.

Meanwhile, though Wilson was indifferent to the clause, there was fierce resistance to it from the American public, and he ruled as Conference chairman that a unanimous vote was required for the Japanese proposal to pass. Ultimately, on the day of the vote, only 11 of the 17 delegates voted in favor of the proposal. The defeat of the proposal influenced Japan's turn from co-operation with the Western world, into more nationalist and militarist policies and approaches.

=== Territorial claims ===
The Japanese claim to Shantung faced strong challenges from the Chinese patriotic student group. In 1914, at the outset of the war, Japan seized the territory that had been granted to Germany in 1897 and seized the German islands in the Pacific north of the equator. In 1917, Japan made secret agreements with Britain, France, and Italy to guarantee their annexation of these territories. With Britain, there was an agreement to support British annexation of the Pacific Islands south of the Equator.

Despite a generally pro-Chinese view by the American delegation, Article 156 of the Treaty of Versailles transferred German concessions in Jiaozhou Bay, China, to Japan rather than returning sovereign authority to China. The leader of the Chinese delegation, Lu Zhengxiang, demanded a reservation be inserted, before he would sign the treaty. After the reservation was denied, the treaty was signed by all the delegations except that of China. Chinese outrage over that provision led to demonstrations known as the May Fourth Movement. The Pacific Islands north of the equator became a class C mandate, administered by Japan.

== American approach ==
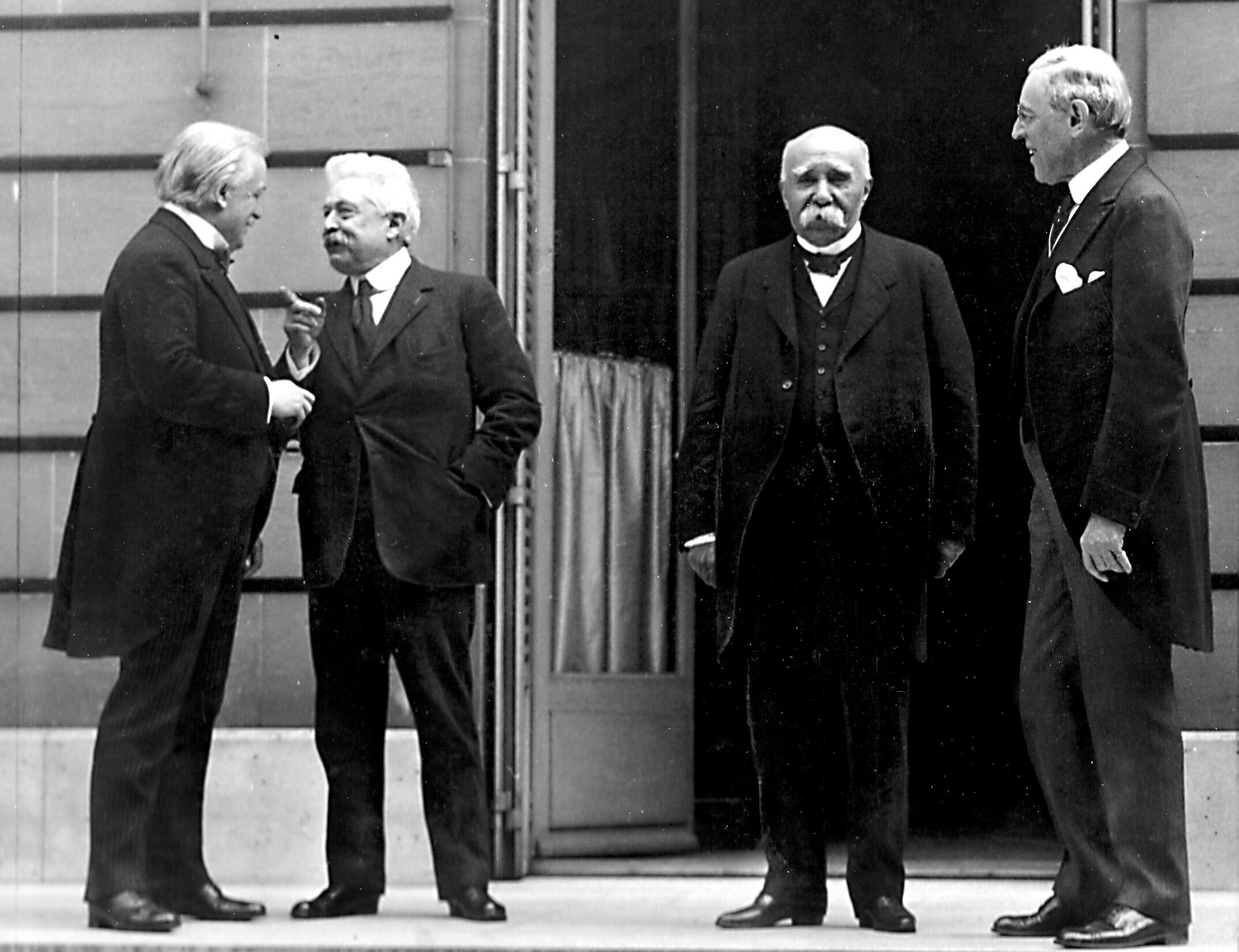
"The Big Four" made all the major decisions at the Paris Peace Conference (from left to right, David Lloyd George of Britain, Vittorio Emanuele Orlando of Italy, Georges Clemenceau of France, and Woodrow Wilson of the United States).

Until Wilson's arrival in Europe in December 1918, no sitting American president had ever visited the continent nor left North America during their presidency. Wilson's 1918 Fourteen Points had helped win many hearts and minds as the war ended, not only in America but all over Europe, including Germany, as well as its allies in and the former subjects of the Ottoman Empire.

Wilson's diplomacy and his Fourteen Points had essentially established the conditions for the armistices that had brought an end to World War I. Wilson felt it to be his duty and obligation to the people of the world to be a prominent figure at the peace negotiations. High hopes and expectations were placed on him to deliver what he had promised for the postwar era. In doing so, Wilson ultimately began to lead the foreign policy of the United States towards interventionism, a move that has been strongly resisted in some United States circles ever since.

Once Wilson arrived, however, he found "rivalries, and conflicting claims previously submerged." He worked mostly at trying to influence both the French, led by Georges Clemenceau, and the British, led by David Lloyd George, in their treatment of Germany and its allies in Europe and the former Ottoman Empire in the Middle East. Wilson's attempts to gain acceptance of his Fourteen Points ultimately failed; France and Britain each refused to adopt specific points as well as certain core principles.

Several of the Fourteen Points conflicted with the desires of European powers. The United States did not consider Article 231 of the Treaty of Versailles, which declared Germany solely responsible for the war, was fair or warranted. (The United States did not sign peace treaties with the Central Powers until 1921 under President Warren G. Harding, when separate documents were signed with Germany, Austria, and Hungary respectively.)

In the Middle East, negotiations were complicated by competing claims and the new mandate system. The United States expressed a hope to establish a more liberal and diplomatic world as stated in the Fourteen Points, in which democracy, sovereignty, liberty and self-determination would be respected. France and Britain, on the other hand, already controlled vast global empires and aspired to maintain and expand their colonial power rather than relinquish it. Various people, both in Washington and the Middle East, sought American mandates, as they identified the United States as a neutral and non-colonial power. American mandates were considered for Syria, Armenia, and the Ottoman Empire.

In light of the previously secret Sykes–Picot Agreement and following the adoption of the mandate system on the Arab provinces of the former Ottoman Empire, the conference heard statements from competing Zionists and Arabs. Wilson then recommended an international commission of inquiry to ascertain the wishes of the local inhabitants. The idea, first accepted by Great Britain and France, was later rejected, but became the purely American King–Crane Commission, which toured all of Syria and Palestine during the summer of 1919, taking statements and sampling opinion. Its report, presented to Wilson, was kept secret from the public until The New York Times broke the story in December 1922. A pro-Zionist joint resolution on Palestine was passed by the United States Congress in September 1922.

Though the Ottoman intelligentsia were hopeful of the application of Wilsonian idealism in the post-war Middle East (especially from point 12 of the Fourteen Points), on 20 March 1919, President Wilson announced his support for detaching Constantinople from the Ottoman Empire.

France and Britain tried to appease Wilson by consenting to the establishment of his League of Nations. However, because of increasing isolationist sentiment and particularly opposition to Article 10 by Henry Cabot Lodge, the United States never ratified the Treaty of Versailles or joined the League.

== Greek approach ==
Greek Prime Minister Eleftherios Venizelos took part in the conference as Greece's chief representative. Wilson was said to have placed Venizelos first for personal ability among all delegates in Paris.

Venizelos proposed Greek expansion in Thrace and Asia Minor, which had been part of the defeated Kingdom of Bulgaria and the Ottoman Empire; Northern Epirus, Imvros; and Tenedos for the realization of the Megali Idea. He also reached the Venizelos-Tittoni agreement with the Italians on the cession of the Dodecanese (apart from Rhodes) to Greece. For the Pontic Greeks, he proposed a common Pontic-Armenian state.

As a liberal politician, Venizelos was a strong supporter of the Fourteen Points and the League of Nations.

== Turkish approach ==
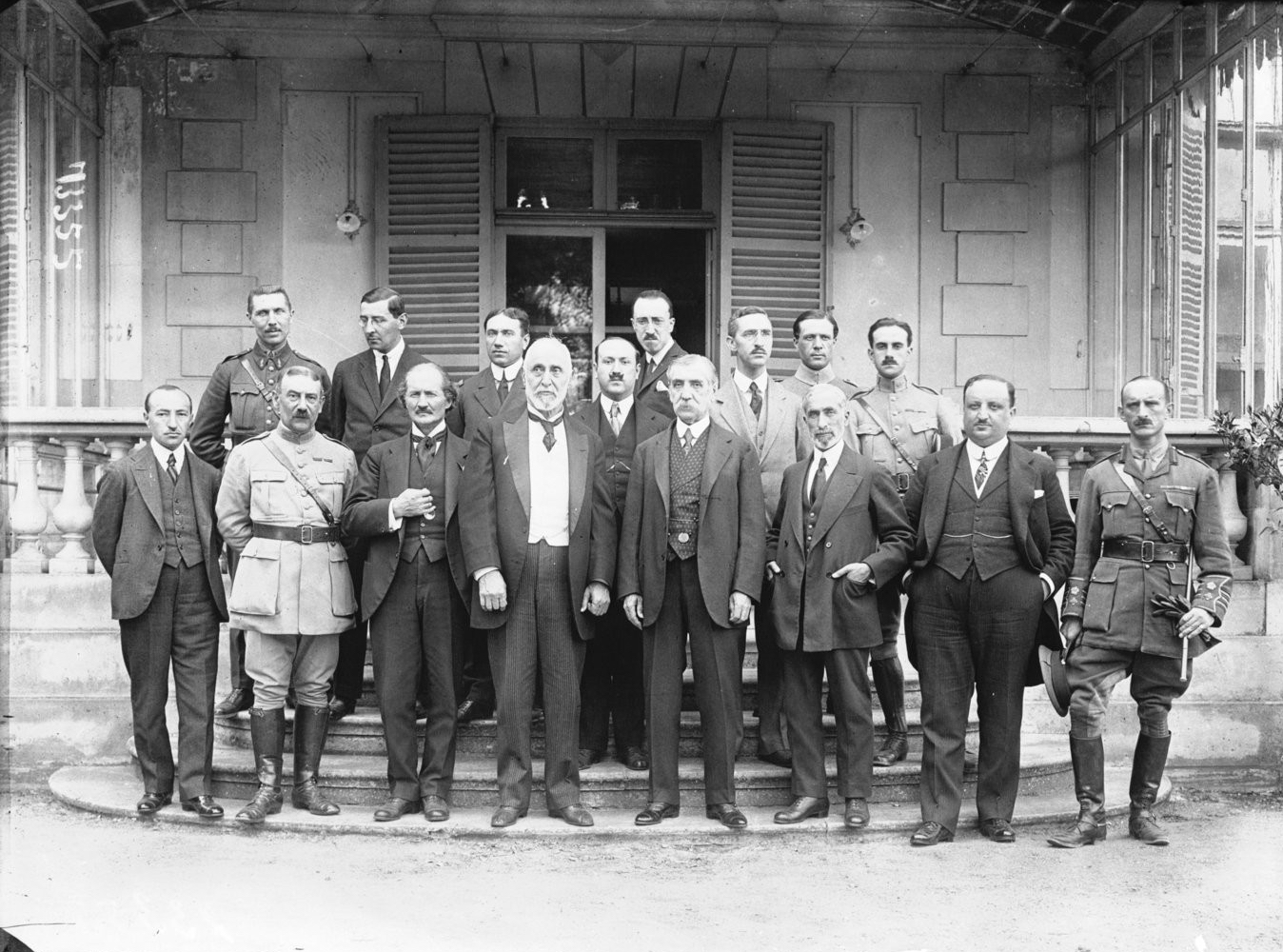
The Turkish diplomatic mission at Château de Monteclin, 1919: left to right: Rıza Tevfik (Bölükbaşı), Ahmed Tevfik Pasha (Okday), Damat Ferid Pasha, Mehmet Tevfik (Biren), Reşat Halis

== Chinese approach ==
The Chinese delegation was led by Lu Zhengxiang, who was accompanied by Wellington Koo and Cao Rulin. Koo demanded Germany's concessions on Shandong be returned to China. He also called for an end to imperialist institutions such as extraterritoriality, legation guards, and foreign leaseholds. Despite American support and the ostensible spirit of self-determination, the Western powers refused his claims but instead transferred the German concessions to Japan. That sparked widespread student protests in China on 4 May, later known as the May Fourth Movement, which eventually pressured the government into refusing to sign the Treaty of Versailles. Thus, the Chinese delegation at the conference was the only one not to sign the treaty at the signing ceremony.

Liang Qichao led a group of private citizens to the Paris Peace Conference to lobby for China's interests and provide reports back to China. The group viewed China's goals as recovering Qingdao, restoring the other aspects of China's sovereignty that had been lost through the unequal treaties, and becoming an equal member of the community of nations. Liang hoped that the conference would bring about a peaceful foundation for world relations. Liang became disillusioned by the failure of the conference to address China's rights and the poverty that he and the group saw in Europe. The impact of the group's reports back to China were one of the contributing factors to the May Fourth Movement.

In China, the result at the conference was deemed the "betrayal at Versailles" and damaged the image of the Western countries. It led many in Chinese elite circles to doubt the value of Western world views and whether such views could be adopted in China.

== Other nations' approach ==
=== All-Russian Government (Whites) ===
Russia was formally excluded from the Conference, although it had fought against the Central Powers for three years. However, the Russian Provincial Council, chaired by Prince Lvov, the successor to the Russian Constituent Assembly and the political arm of the Russian White movement, attended the conference and was represented by the former tsarist minister Sergey Sazonov, who, if the tsar had not been overthrown, would most likely have attended the conference anyway. The Council maintained the position of an indivisible Russia, but some were prepared to negotiate over the loss of Poland and Finland. The Council suggested all matters relating to territorial claims or demands for autonomy within the former Russian Empire be referred to a new All-Russian Constituent Assembly.

=== Baltic states ===
Delegations from the Baltic states of Estonia, Latvia and Lithuania, led respectively by Jaan Poska, Jānis Čakste and Augustinas Voldemaras, also participated in the conference, and successfully achieved international recognition of the independence of Estonia, Latvia and Lithuania.

Lithuania in particular contested Polish claims over Vilnius and fought against their efforts to reform a state similar to the Polish-Lithuanian Commonwealth with Poles at the head. Their failure to gain Vilnius at the Conference would be a point of tension between them and the Polish throughout the interwar period.

=== Ukraine ===
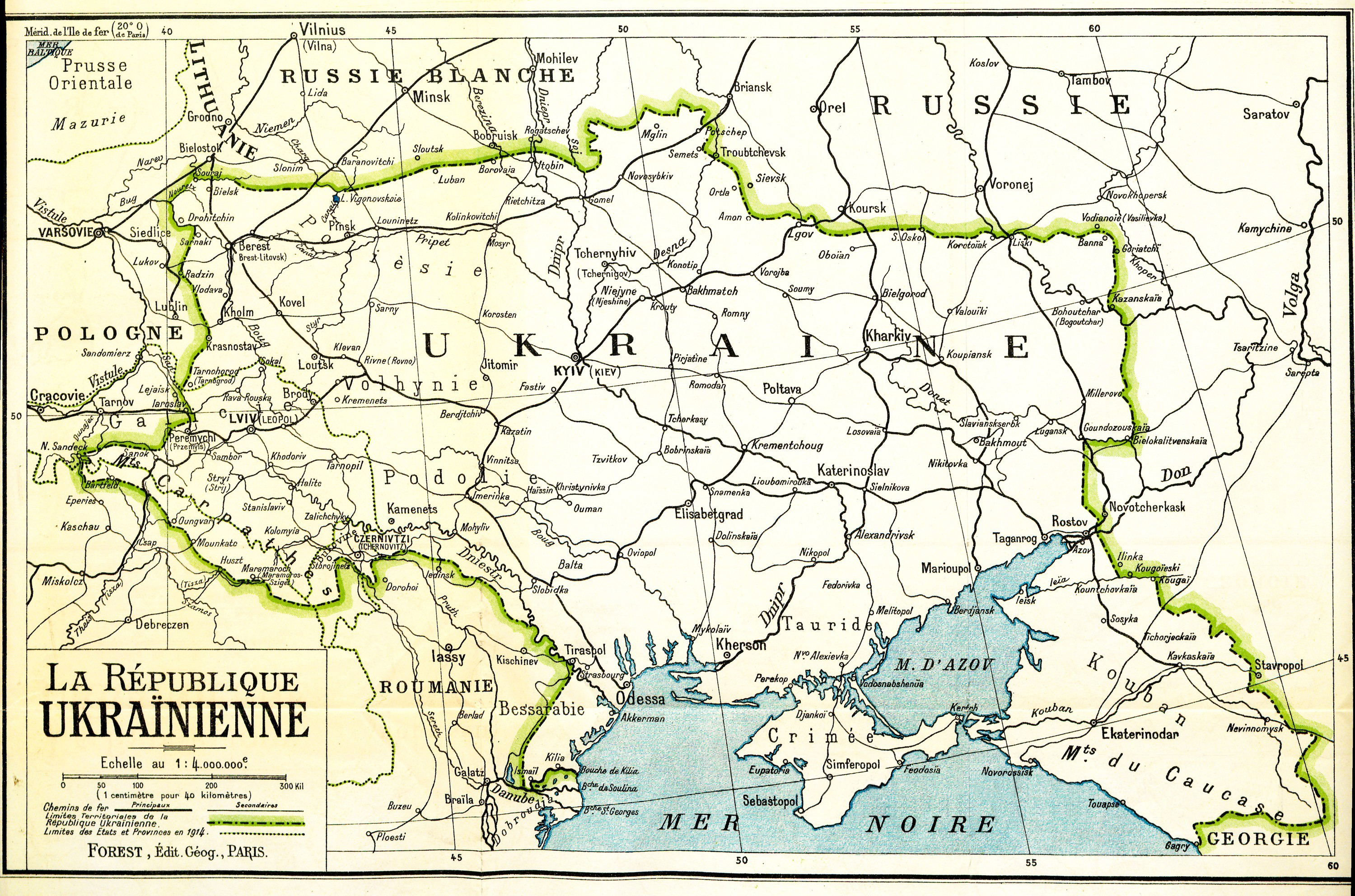
Ukraine map presented by the Ukrainian delegation at the Paris Peace Conference in a bid that was ultimately rejected, which led to the incorporation of Ukraine into the Soviet Union.

Ukraine had its best opportunity to win recognition and support from foreign powers at the conference. At a meeting of the Big Five on 16 January, Lloyd George called Ukrainian leader Symon Petliura an adventurer and dismissed Ukraine as an anti-Bolshevik stronghold. Sir Eyre Crowe, British Undersecretary of State for Foreign Affairs, spoke against a union of East Galicia and Poland. The British cabinet never decided whether to support a united or dismembered Russia. The United States was sympathetic to a strong, united Russia, as a counterpoise to Japan, but Britain feared a threat to India. Petliura appointed Count Tyshkevich as his representative to the Vatican, and Pope Benedict XV recognized Ukrainian independence, but Ukraine was effectively ignored.

=== Belarus ===
A delegation of the Belarusian Democratic Republic, under Prime Minister Anton Łuckievič, also participated in the conference, and attempted to gain international recognition of the independence of Belarus. On the way to the conference, the delegation was received by Czechoslovak president Tomáš Masaryk in Prague. During the conference, Łuckievič had meetings with the exiled foreign minister of Admiral Alexander Kolchak's Russian government, Sergey Sazonov, and Polish prime minister Ignacy Jan Paderewski.

=== Caucasus ===
European theatre of the Russian Civil War in the summer of 1918

The republics of the Caucasus – the Mountainous Republic of the Northern Caucasus, Georgia, Armenia, and Azerbaijan – all sent a delegation to the conference. The Georgian delegation included Nikolay Chkheidze, Irakli Tsereteli, and Zurab Avalishvili. The Armenian side was represented by Avetis Aharonian, Hamo Ohanjanyan, and Armen Garo, while the Azerbaijani mission was headed by Alimardan bey Topchubashov and included Mammad Hasan Hajinski, Akbar agha Sheykhulislamov, Ahmet Ağaoğlu and Mahammad Maharramov.

Their attempts to gain protection from threats posed by the ongoing Russian Civil War largely failed since none of the major powers was interested in taking a mandate over territories in the Caucasus. After a series of delays, the three South Caucasus republics ultimately gained de facto recognition from the Supreme Council of the Allied powers but only after all Western European major powers had withdrawn from the Caucasus, except for a British contingent stationed in Batumi, Georgia. Georgia was recognized de facto on 12 January 1920, followed by Azerbaijan the same day and Armenia on 19 January 1920. The Allied leaders decided to limit their assistance to the Caucasian republics to the supply of arms, munitions, and food.

=== Minority rights ===
At the insistence of Wilson, the Big Four required Poland to sign a treaty on 28 June 1919 that guaranteed minority rights in the new nation. Poland signed under protest and made little effort to enforce the specified rights for Germans, Jews, Ukrainians, and other minorities. Similar treaties were signed by Czechoslovakia, Romania, Yugoslavia, Greece, Austria, Hungary, and Bulgaria and later by Latvia, Estonia, and Lithuania. Estonia had already given cultural autonomy to minorities in its declaration of independence. Finland and Germany were not asked to sign a minority treaty.

In Poland, the key provisions were to become fundamental laws, which would override any national legal codes or legislation. The new country pledged to assure "full and complete protection of life and liberty to all individuals... without distinction of birth, nationality, language, race, or religion." Freedom of religion was guaranteed to everyone. Most residents were given citizenship, but there was considerable ambiguity on who was covered. The treaty guaranteed basic civil, political, and cultural rights and required all citizens to be equal before the law and enjoy identical rights of citizens and workers. Polish was to be the national language, but the treaty provided for minority languages to be freely used privately, in commerce, in religion, in the press, at public meetings, and before all courts. Minorities were to be permitted to establish and control at their own expense private charities, churches, social institutions, and schools, without interference from the government, which was required to set up German-language public schools in districts that had been German before the war. All education above the primary level was to be conducted exclusively in the national language. Article 12 was the enforcement clause and gave the Council of the League of Nations the responsibility to monitor and enforce the treaties.

=== Korea ===
After a failed attempt by the Korean National Association to send a three-man delegation to Paris, a delegation of Koreans from China and Hawaii made it there. It included a representative from the Korean Provisional Government in Shanghai, Kim Kyu-sik. They were aided by the Chinese, who were eager for the opportunity to embarrass Japan at the international forum. Several top Chinese leaders at the time, including Sun Yat-sen, told US diplomats that the conference should take up the question of Korean independence. However, the Chinese, already locked in a struggle against the Japanese, could do little else for Korea. Other than China, no nation took the Koreans seriously at the conference because it already had the status of a Japanese colony. The failure of Korean nationalists to gain support from the conference ended their hopes of foreign support.

=== Vietnam ===
Nguyen Ai Quoc (later known as Ho Chi Minh) petitioned the conference, seeking self determination and independence for the Vietnamese people. However, given that at the time Vietnam was a French colony, this petition was largely ignored.

=== Palestine, Syria, and Lebanon ===
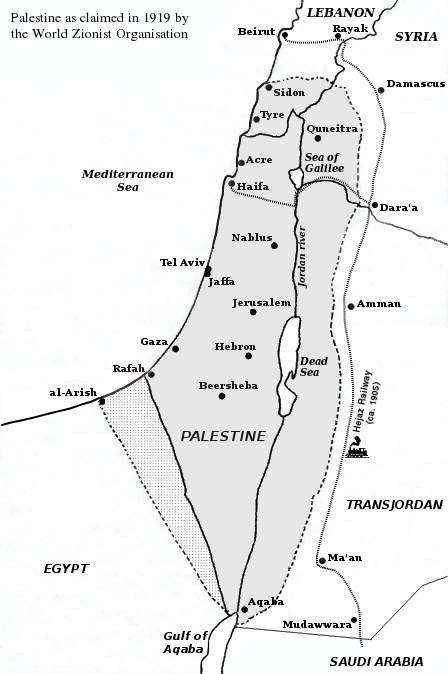
The Zionist state claimed at the conference in Palestine

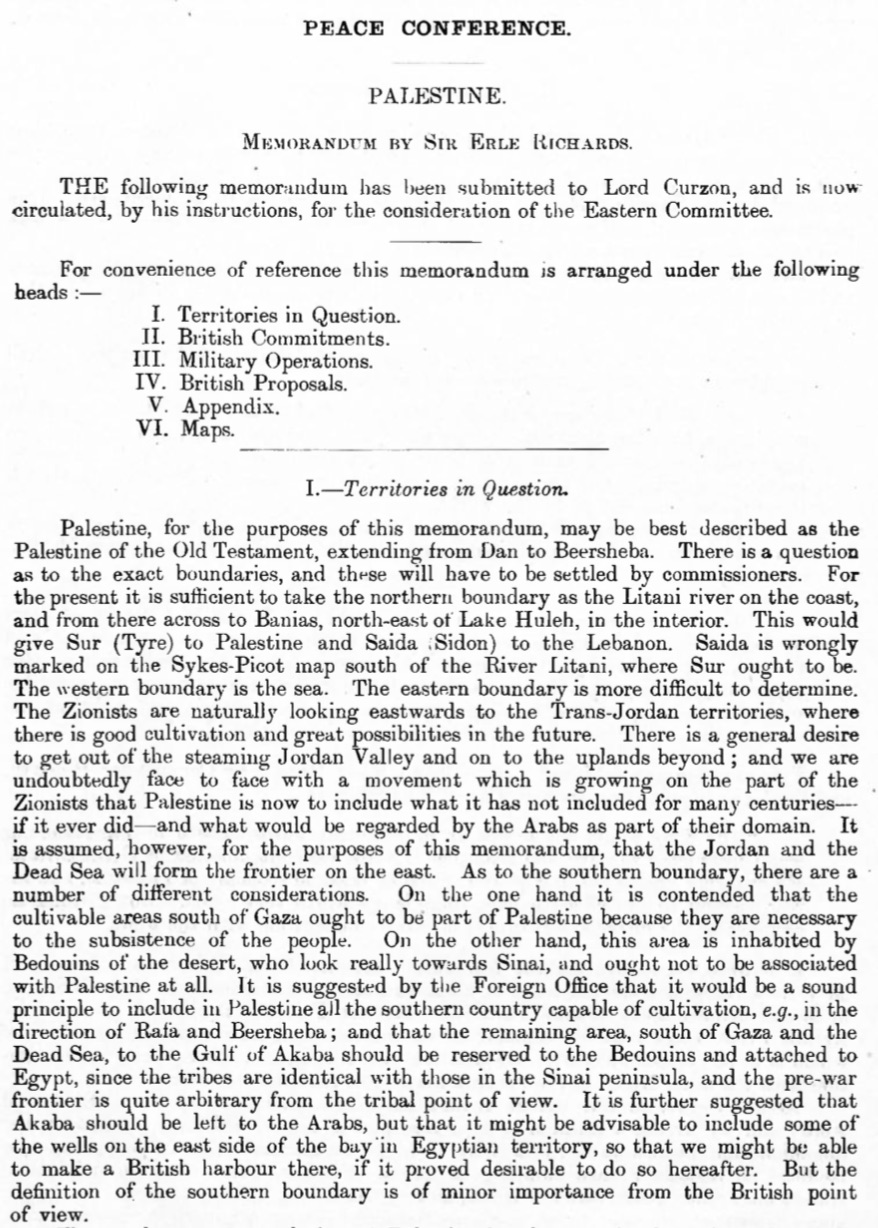
British memorandum on Palestine before the conference

After the conference's decision to separate the former Arab provinces from the Ottoman Empire and to apply the new mandate-system to them, the World Zionist Organization submitted its draft resolutions for consideration by the conference.

The February 1919 statement included the following main points: recognition of Jewish "title" over the land, a declaration of the borders (significantly larger than in the prior Sykes-Picot agreement), and League of Nations sovereignty under British mandate. An offshoot of the conference was convened at San Remo in 1920, leading to the creation of the Mandate for Palestine, which was to come into force in 1923.

The conference ultimately prioritized European strategic and colonial interests. France was granted mandates over Syria and Lebanon, while Britain received mandates over Iraq, Transjordan, and Palestine, formalized later at the 1920 San Remo Conference.

Lebanese representatives sought French guarantees, though some preferred to remain linked economically with Syria. Emir Feisal advocated for Arab unity, fearing partition, but the Allied powers’ priorities overrode these requests.

=== Assyrians ===
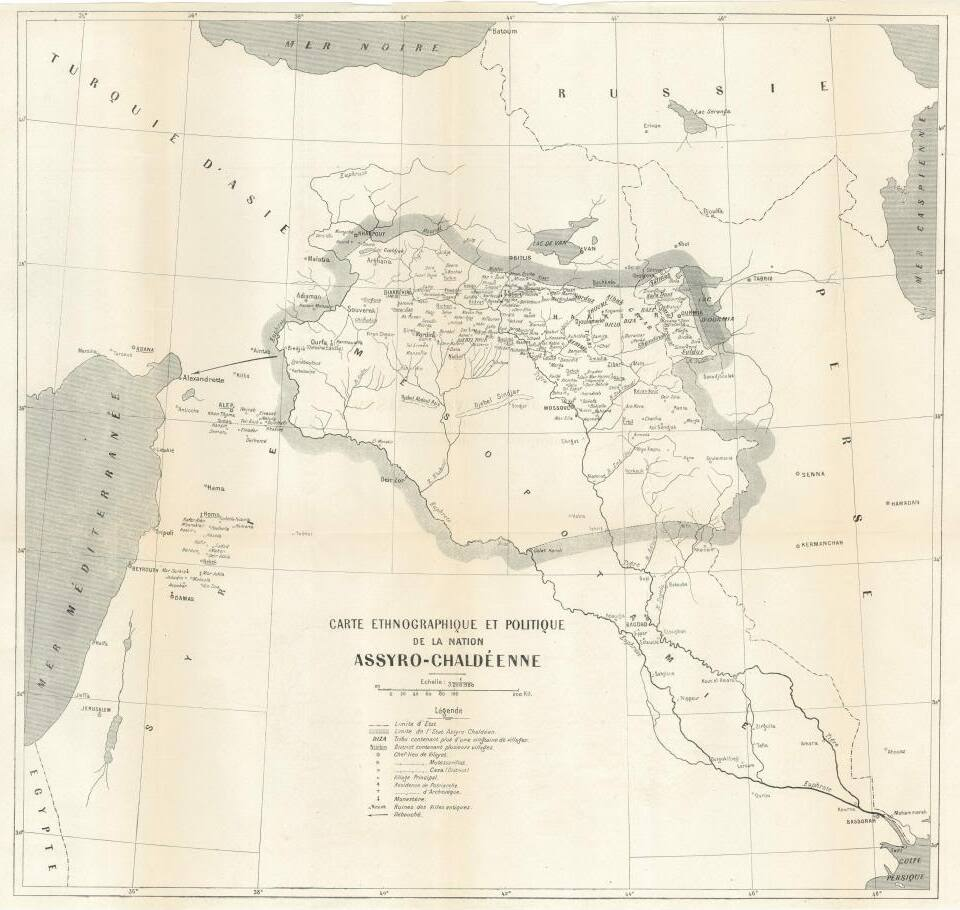
Map of Assyria at the Paris Peace Conference

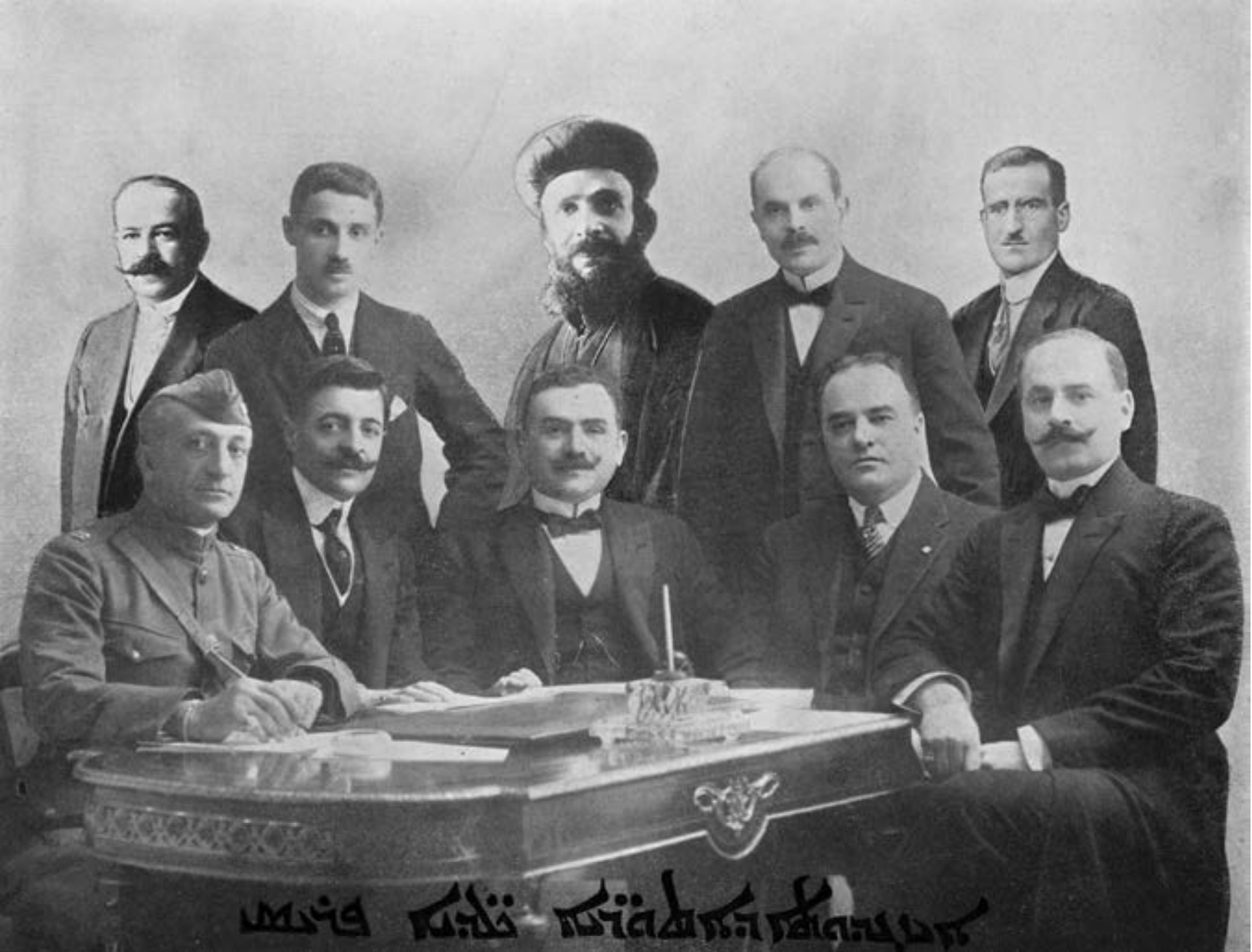
Montage of the Assyro-Chaldean delegation. Back row, left to right: Said Radji, Moussa Shukur, Metran Afrem Barsoom, Pierre Pacus, and Brother Aram Ablahad. Front row, left to right: Major A. K. Yoosuf, Rustem Najib, Dr. Jean Zabony, Rev. Joel E. Werda, and Said Anthony Namik.

In the years leading up to the conference, up to 300,000 Assyrians died during Sayfo. A multi-denominational delegation was formed to advocate Assyrian independence in response to the genocide. Syriac Orthodox Bishop of Syria Aphrem Barsoum (b. 1887), later Patriarch of the church, has often been depicted as the delegation's leader, traveling to the conference to express the wishes of his Assyrian people. Ephrem Rahmani of the Syriac Catholic Church and Yousef VI Emmanuel II Thomas of the Chaldean Catholic Church, as well as representatives of the "Nestorian" church were also present at the conference.

Different delegations of the larger Assyro-Chaldean delegation came from different parts of the world. A delegation from the United States was present, representing the Assyrian National Association in America and consisted of Rev. Joel E. Warda and Abraham K. Yoosuf (of Syriac Orthodox faith). A delegation from Constantinople represented the Assyro-Chaldean National Council, formed in 1919 after Syriac-Orthodox, Chaldean Catholics and Syriac Catholics had united and declared their basic political and national unity under the "Assyro-Chaldean" name. There was also a delegation from Caucasia, consisting of three people; although they had worked with the American delegation, they eventually began to act on their own. Lastly, a delegation from Persia consisted of two people, advocating exclusively for Persian Assyrian rights.

Surma D'Bait Mar Shimun represented her brother, Shimun XIX Benyamin, as a de facto leader of the Church of the East, but was prevented by the committee from attending. Similarly, military leaders Agha Petros and Malik Qambar of the Assyro-Chaldean battalion were not allowed to attend the conference. Six claims were made for the case of Assyrian autonomy, requesting an Assyrian state encompassing Mosul, Al-Jazira Province, Bashkala, and Urmia. Syriac Orthodox and Catholic demands were more modest by comparison, requesting protection of France and recognition of losses from the Assyrian genocide, with Diyarbakır, Bitlis, Elazığ (Harput), and Urfa as compensation.

The incohesive structure of all the delegations is cited as part of the failure of the overall delegation's advocacy, being noted by Yoosuf in his personal writings. Yoosuf himself lamented the lack of victory for a feasible solution to Assyrian autonomy and unity within the Assyrian community, writing "Assyrians have not yet learned the meaning of national sanctity...It is evident that we cannot accomplish these things without American and English sympathizers." Several disagreements, such as which power to seek for protection, the use of "Assyro-Chaldean", and frustration over lack of progress, hindered the aspirations of the delegation. By the end of the conference, Assyrians would be guaranteed minority rights and local autonomy in an independent Kurdistan under the Treaty of Sevres, but these were subdued by the Treaty of Lausanne and never put into effect.

Many figures of the time reflected on the conference, believing that the French and British were simply using the Assyrians for their own interests. Barsoum would later reflect on his personal involvement, dismayed at the lack of compassion he felt from the Allied powers. After the conference and the Simele massacre, he would develop an anti-Assyrian stance, dissociating himself and the SOC from association with Assyrian ancestry/identity.

=== Kurds ===
The Kurds were not officially represented as a state delegation but were represented by figures such as Sharif Pasha, an experienced diplomat and former Ottoman ambassador, who advocated for Kurdish self-determination. Kurdish elites lobbied for autonomy or an independent state in areas spanning eastern Turkey, northern Iraq, and surrounding regions. Their efforts were grounded in support from U.S. President Woodrow Wilson’s 14 Points, which promoted the idea of self-determination for peoples under Ottoman rule.

=== Aromanians ===
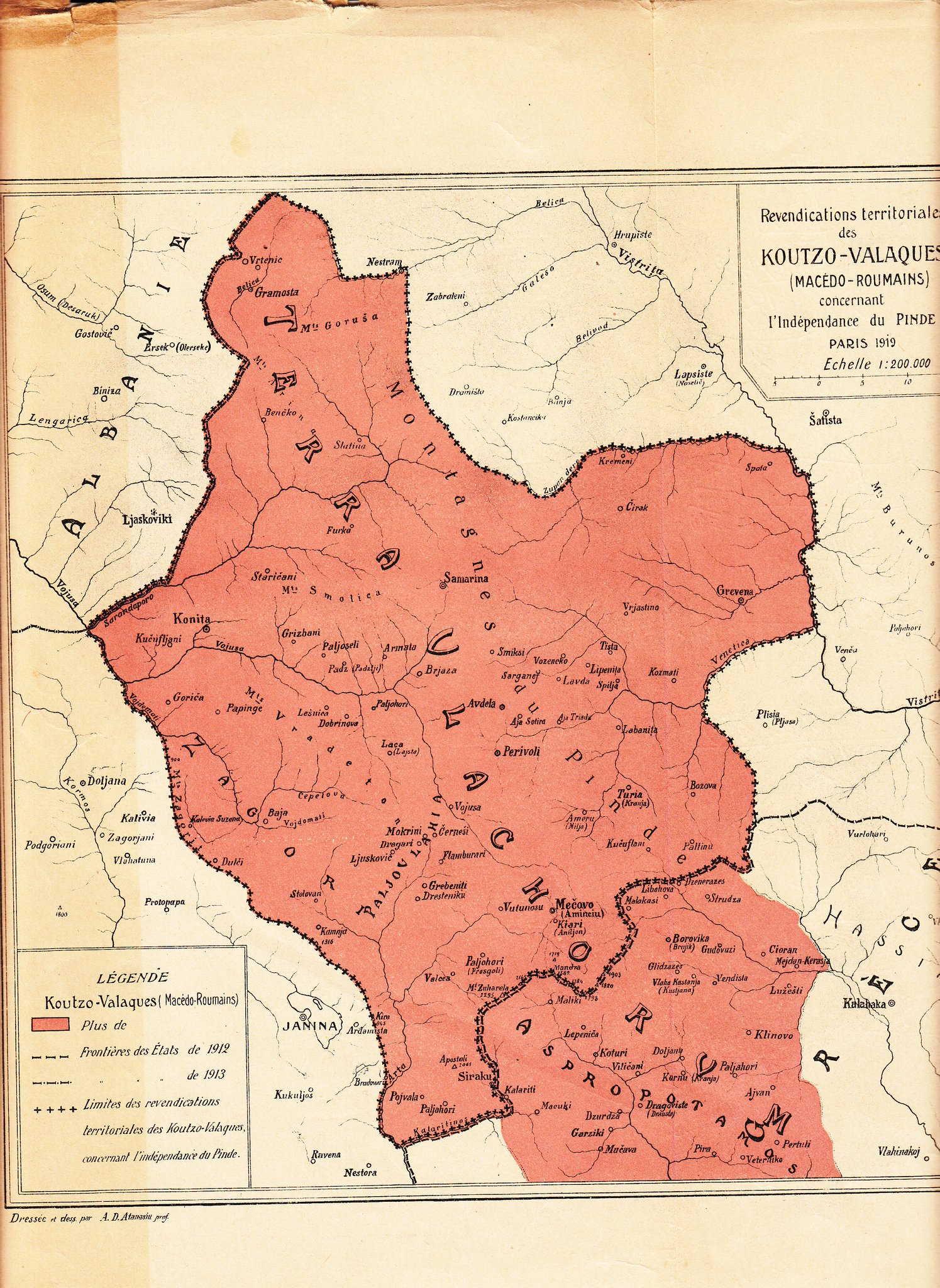
Proposal of the autonomous or independent region by the Aromanian delegation, known as "Terra Vlachorum", "Vlach" being another term used by the Aromanian to identify themselves

During the Peace Conference, a delegation of Aromanians participated to fulfill autonomist wishes for the Aromanian people in the same vein as the Samarina Republic attempt two years earlier, but failed to accomplish any recognition for the self-rule desires of their people.

=== Persia ===
Although Persia (then officially Persia) declared neutrality during the First World War, its territory was repeatedly violated and occupied by British, Russian, and Ottoman forces, leading to widespread famine, economic collapse, and loss of life.

Mohammad Gholi Majd's book, The Great Famine and Genocide in Persia, 1917–1919, identifies a number of allied sources that detail the proportion and scale of the deaths, and alleges that as many as 8–10 million died, across the whole nation, based on an alternate pre-famine Persian population estimate of 19 million. Timothy C. Winegard and Pordeli et al. acknowledge the figures suggested by Majd. A 2023 article in Third World Quarterly also favorably cited Majd's work. Willem Floor criticized Majd's work.

In 1919, the Iranian delegation, led by Foreign Minister Prince Firouz Mirza Nosrat-ed-Dowleh, traveled to Paris to present demands for the evacuation of foreign troops, the restoration of full sovereignty, and reparations for wartime damages. They also sought recognition of Iran's independence under international law and proposed revisions to the 1907 Anglo-Russian Convention, which had divided Iran into spheres of influence without its consent. Despite their formal appeals and the moral weight of Iran’s suffering, the great powers refused to admit the delegation to the main sessions, largely due to British opposition and the perception that Iran's requests conflicted with their strategic interests in the region. Consequently, Iran’s voice remained largely absent from the final decisions of the conference, reinforcing its political vulnerability in the postwar order.

=== Ireland ===
The Irish delegation, led by Seán T. O'Kelly and George Gavan Duffy, sought international recognition for the Irish Republic at the Paris Peace Conference but ultimately failed to secure an official hearing, despite attracting sympathy in France and mobilizing Irish-American support. The unrecognized Irish Republic sent representatives in hope the republic declared at the Easter Rising in 1916 would be recognised, but they were ignored.

=== Ethiopia ===
The Ethiopian Empire sent a delegation to the Paris Peace Conference following World War I, represented by Dejazmach Tafari and Dejazmatch Nadew. They sought international recognition of its territorial integrity and independence from Italian Eritrea, British Somaliland, and French Somaliland. Also wanted to be considered not a "barbarous state" but rather a "civilised [African] country" with unique interests, so that it might strengthen its position on the world stage as a subject of international law, being capable of participating in the international arena instead of remaining isolated.

== Women's approach ==
An unprecedented aspect of the conference was concerted pressure brought to bear on delegates by a committee of women, who sought to establish and entrench women's fundamental social, economic, and political rights, such as that of suffrage, within the peace framework. Although they were denied seats at the Paris Conference, the leadership of Marguerite de Witt-Schlumberger, the president of the French Union for Women's Suffrage, caused an Inter-Allied Women's Conference (IAWC) to be convened, which met from 10 February to 10 April 1919.

The IAWC lobbied Wilson and then the other delegates of the Paris Conference to admit women to its committees, and it was successful in achieving a hearing from the conference's Commissions for International Labour Legislation and then the League of Nations Commission. One key and concrete outcome of the IAWC's work was Article 7 of the Covenant of the League of Nations: "All positions under or in connection with the League, including the Secretariat, shall be open equally to men and women." More generally, the IAWC placed the issue of women's rights at the center of the new world order that was established in Paris.

== Pan-African Congress ==
The first Pan-African Congress, supported by W. E. B. Du Bois, unsuccessfully petitioned the Paris Conference to turn Germany's colonies over to an international organization instead of to other colonial powers.

== Historical assessments ==
The remaking of the world map at the conferences gave birth to a number of critical conflict-prone contradictions internationally that would become some of the causes of World War II. The British historian Eric Hobsbawm contended:

[N]o equally systematic attempt has been made before or since, in Europe or anywhere else, to redraw the political map on national lines.... The logical implication of trying to create a continent neatly divided into coherent territorial states each inhabited by separate ethnically and linguistically homogeneous population, was the mass expulsion or extermination of minorities. Such was and is the reductio ad absurdum of nationalism in its territorial version, although this was not fully demonstrated until the 1940s.

Hobsbawm and other left-wing historians have argued that Wilson's Fourteen Points, particularly the principle of self-determination, were measures that were primarily against the Bolsheviks and designed, by playing the nationalist card, to tame the revolutionary fever that was sweeping across Europe in the wake of the October Revolution and the end of the war:

[T]he first Western reaction to the Bolsheviks' appeal to the peoples to make peace – and their publication of the secret treaties in which the Allies had carved up Europe among themselves – had been President Wilson's Fourteen Points, which played the nationalist card against Lenin's international appeal. A zone of small nation-states was to form a sort of quarantine belt against the Red virus.... [T]he establishment of new small nation-states along Wilsonian lines, though far from eliminating national conflicts in the zone of revolutions,... diminished the scope for Bolshevik revolution. That, indeed, had been the intention of the Allied peacemakers.

The right-wing historian John Lewis Gaddis agreed: "When Woodrow Wilson made the principle of self-determination one of his Fourteen Points his intent had been to undercut the appeal of Bolshevism."

That view has a long history and can be summarised by Ray Stannard Baker's famous remark: "Paris cannot be understood without Moscow."

The British historian Antony Lentin viewed Lloyd George's role in Paris as a major success:

Unrivaled as a negotiator, he had powerful combative instincts and indomitable determinism, and succeeded through charm, insight, resourcefulness, and simple pugnacity. Although sympathetic to France's desires to keep Germany under control, he did much to prevent the French from gaining power, attempted to extract Britain from the Anglo-French entente, inserted the war-guilt clause, and maintained a liberal and realist view of the postwar world. By doing so, he managed to consolidate power over the House [of Commons], secured his power base, expanded the empire, and sought a European balance of power.

== Cultural references ==
- British official artists William Orpen and Augustus John were present at the Conference.
- World's End (1940), the first novel in Upton Sinclair's Pulitzer Prize-winning Lanny Budd series, describes the political machinations and consequences of the Paris Peace Conference through much of the book's second half, with Sinclair's narrative including many historically accurate characters and events.
- The first two books of novelist Robert Goddard's The Wide World trilogy (The Ways of the World and The Corners of the Globe) are centered around the diplomatic machinations that formed the background to the conference.
- Paris 1919 (1973), the third studio album by Welsh musician John Cale, is named after the Paris Peace Conference, and its title song explores various aspects of early-20th-century culture and history in Western Europe.
- A Dangerous Man: Lawrence After Arabia (1992) is a British television film starring Ralph Fiennes as T. E. Lawrence and Alexander Siddig as Emir Faisal, depicting their struggles to secure an independent Arab state at the conference.
- "Paris, May 1919" is a 1993 episode of The Young Indiana Jones Chronicles, written by Jonathan Hales and directed by David Hare, in which Indiana Jones is shown working as a translator with the American delegation at the Paris Peace Conference.

== See also ==
- List of Paris meetings, agreements and declarations
- Treaty of Versailles
- Rue Nitot
- Diplomatic history of World War I
- Commission of Responsibilities
- Congress of Vienna
- Czech Corridor
- Reparation Commission
- The Inquiry
- Minority Treaties
- Congress of Oppressed Nationalities of the Austro-Hungarian Empire
- The Heavenly Twins
- Armenian National Delegation

== Sources ==
- Aston, Charlotte (2010). Makers of the Modern World: Antonius Piip, Zigfrĩds Meierovics and Augustus Voldemaras. London, UK: Haus Publishing. ISBN 978-1905791-71-2.
- Donef, Racho; Travis, Hannibal (19 July 2017). "The Assyrian delegation at the Paris Peace Conference". The Assyrian Genocide: Cultural and Political Legacies (1st ed.). London: Routledge. pp. 217–238. ISBN 9781315269832.
- Gaddis, John Lewis (2005). The Cold War. London: Allen Lane. ISBN 978-0-713-99912-9.
- Hobsbawm, E. J. (1992). Nations and Nationalism since 1780: Programme, Myth, Reality. Canto (2nd ed.). Cambridge: Cambridge University Press. ISBN 978-0-521-43961-9.
- Lundgren, Svante (2020). Why did the Assyrian lobbying at the Paris Peace Conference fail?. Chronos : Revue d'Histoire de l'Université de Balamand. pp. 63–73.
- McFadden, David W. (1993). Alternative Paths: Soviets and Americans, 1917–1920. New York, NY: Oxford University Press. ISBN 978-0-195-36115-5.
- Majd, Mohammad Gholi (2003). The great famine and genocide in Persia, 1917-1919. Lanham, MD: University Press of America. ISBN 978-0-7618-2633-0. OCLC 52540272.
- Messkoub, Mahmood (2006). "Social Policy in Iran in the Twentieth Century". Iranian Studies. 39 (2): 227–252. doi:10.1080/00210860600628773. JSTOR 4311815. S2CID 162207668.
- Pordeli, Mohammad Reza; Abavysany, Malihe; Mollashahi, Maryam; Sanchooli, Doost Ali (2017). "A Study of the Causes of Famine in Iran during World War I". Review of European Studies. 9 (2): 296–300. doi:10.5539/res.v9n2p296. – Open access material licensed under the Creative Commons Attribution 4.0.
- Winegard, Timothy C. (2016). The First World Oil War. Reference, Information and Interdisciplinary Subjects Series. University of Toronto Press. ISBN 9781487500733.
