= Agreement Regarding the Restoration of the State of Peace between Germany and China (1921) =

1921 treaty between Germany and China

An agreement was signed in Beijing on May 20, 1921, between the German and the Chinese governments to restore peaceful relations after the First World War. The main reason for the treaty was that the Chinese government had refrained from signing the Treaty of Versailles since it granted the Empire of Japan government control over Chinese territory, the formerly-German concession of Shandong. The agreement benefited both sides by leading to cooperation between the two governments in the military field that lasted until the eve of the Second World War, when Germany and Japan signed the Anti-Comintern Pact. The treaty was registered in League of Nations Treaty Series on May 15, 1922.

== Background ==
The Chinese government declared war on the German Empire on August 14, 1917, and thus became one of the Allied Powers of the First World War. On June 28, 1919, the Treaty of Versailles between the Allied governments and the German government was signed, but the Chinese delegation was instructed by the government in Beijing not to sign the treaty, since it granted the Japanese control over areas in China. As a result, the diplomatic state of war between Berlin and Beijing was not terminated.

On September 15, 1919, Chinese President Hsu Shih-chang issued a decree lifting enemy state restrictions from the German government. On May 20, 1921, both governments concluded a treaty to restore the state of peace between them without recognizing the transfer of the former German colonies in China to Japanese control.

== Terms ==
The agreement was accompanied by a joint declaration in which both governments agreed that their relations would be governed by the main provisions of the Treaty of Versailles, without accepting the transfer of territories from China to Japanese control. The agreement restored diplomatic and trade relations between the two governments and abolished German consular jurisdiction over German citizens staying in China, a practice that had existed prior to the war.

== See also ==
- Treaty of Versailles
