= List of shipwrecks in July 1923 =

The list of shipwrecks in July 1923 includes ships sunk, foundered, grounded, or otherwise lost during July 1923.

== 1 July ==
List of shipwrecks: 1 July 1923
Ship	State	Description
Reichenfels	Germany	The cargo ship struck rocks off Viipuri, Finland and was beached.

== 2 July ==
List of shipwrecks: 2 July 1923
Ship	State	Description
Advance	United States	The cargo ship ran aground on Shut-in Island, Nova Scotia, Canada. She broke in two and was a total loss.

== 3 July ==
List of shipwrecks: 3 July 1923
Ship	State	Description
Newtown	United Kingdom	The cargo ship was driven ashore at Lockeport, Nova Scotia, Canada. She was refloated on 14 July.

== 4 July ==
List of shipwrecks: 4 July 1923
Ship	State	Description
Claudegallus	France	The cargo ship ran aground bear Mostaganem, Algeria. Her crew were rescued. She was refloated later that day and taken to Mostaganem for examination.
Hilarius	United Kingdom	The cargo ship came ashore at Port Hastings, Nova Scotia, Canada. She was refloated on 8 July.

== 5 July ==
List of shipwrecks: 5 July 1923
Ship	State	Description
Liège	Belgium	The cargo ship ran aground at Buenos Aires, Argentina. She was refloated on 11 July.

== 6 July ==
List of shipwrecks: 6 July 1923
Ship	State	Description
Standard	United States	The 15-gross register ton, 45.8-foot (14.0 m) fishing vessel sank suddenly between Point Vallenor (55°25′35″N 131°51′00″W) and Guard Island in Southeast Alaska. The only person on board survived.

== 7 July ==
List of shipwrecks: 7 July 1923
Ship	State	Description
Butio	Portugal	The cargo ship was severely damaged by fire at Port da Cruz, Madeira.
Caesarea	United Kingdom	Caesarea. On departing St Helier harbour, the passenger ferry struck the Pignonet Rock, off Moilmont Point, Jersey, Channel Islands, and was holed. Her captain decided to return to port, but she later struck the Oyster Rock and was beached at St Helier. All 370 passengers were rescued. She was refloated on 20 July and taken to England for repairs. She was later refloated and towed to Southampton, Hampshire, where she arrived on 4 August.
Coquimbo	Chile	The cargo ship was driven ashore at Valparaíso and sank.

== 9 July ==
List of shipwrecks: 9 July 1923
Ship	State	Description
Alert	United States	The four-masted schooner was wrecked at Suva, Fiji.

== 10 July ==
List of shipwrecks: 10 July 1923
Ship	State	Description
Devonier	Belgium	The cargo ship was stranded in the River Plate at Maldonado Point by an exceptionally high tide following a hurricane. The wreck was still in situ in 1953.
General Allenby	United Kingdom	The schooner was driven ashore at Povoa, Portugal and was wrecked. Her crew were rescued.
Montferland	Netherlands	The cargo ship was driven ashore in the River Plate in a hurricane. She was refloated on 22 November.
Rugia	Germany	The ocean liner was driven ashore in the River Plate at Montevideo, Uruguay in a hurricane. Nine hundred passengers were taken off. She was refloated on 29 December.
Tuscany	United Kingdom	The cargo ship sank in the River Plate at Montevideo during a hurricane.

== 12 July ==
List of shipwrecks: 12 July 1923
Ship	State	Description
Assistance	United Kingdom	The tug was rammed and sunk in the Bristol Channel by Legarto (United Kingdom) with the loss of four crew.

== 13 July ==
List of shipwrecks: 13 July 1923
Ship	State	Description
Swiftstar	United States	The tanker departed Colón, Panama. Burnt wreckage from the ship was reported in the Caribbean Sea off San Andrés Island, Colombia on 22 July. Foundered with the loss of all hands.

== 14 July ==
List of shipwrecks: 14 July 1923
Ship	State	Description
Yonan Maru	Japan	The cargo ship ran aground in the Columbia River at Astoria, Oregon, United States.

== 15 July ==
List of shipwrecks: 15 July 1923
Ship	State	Description
Begona No.5	Spain	The cargo ship collided with Eldorado (Sweden) and Sheridan (United Kingdom) in the North Sea off the Cross Sands Lightship (United Kingdom). Begona No.5 and Eldorado both sank. All 43 crew from the two vessels were rescued by George Jewson (United Kingdom).
City of Dunkirk	United Kingdom	The cargo ship collided with Miyajima Maru (Japan) off Quelpart, Japan and was beached.
Danish Rose	United Kingdom	The sailing ship foundered in the North Sea 4 nautical miles (7.4 km) off Brora, Sutherland. Her crew were rescued.

== 18 July ==
List of shipwrecks: 18 July 1923
Ship	State	Description
Golden Crown	United Kingdom	The coaster ran aground on Robben Island, South Africa and was wrecked. Her crew were rescued.

== 19 July ==
List of shipwrecks: 19 July 1923
Ship	State	Description
Jane	Sweden	The cargo ship foundered off Fetlar, Shetland Islands, United Kingdom. Her crew were rescued.

== 20 July ==
List of shipwrecks: 20 July 1923
Ship	State	Description
Togo Maru	Japan	The cargo ship foundered off the coast of Korea.

== 22 July ==
List of shipwrecks: 22 July 1923
Ship	State	Description
Pietro Brizollaria	Italy	The auxiliary sailing vessel caught fire and sank in the Mediterranean Sea 100 nautical miles (190 km) north west of Alexandria, Egypt.

== 24 July ==
List of shipwrecks: 24 July 1923
Ship	State	Description
Seistan	United Kingdom	The cargo ship ran aground in the Hainan Strait. She was refloated on 1 August.

== 26 July ==
List of shipwrecks: 26 July 1923
Ship	State	Description
Villareal	United Kingdom	The cargo ship foundered in the North Sea off Norderney, Germany. Her crew were rescued by Moskov (Denmark).

== 28 July ==
List of shipwrecks: 28 July 1923
Ship	State	Description
Ranier	United States	The cargo ship collided with Mandasan Maru (Japan) at Victoria, V.I. Victoria Island, Nigeria? and was beached.
St. Roch	France	The cargo ship foundered in the Mediterranean Sea off Cape San Sebastián, Catalonia, Spain. Her crew were rescued by Viborg (Denmark).

== 29 July ==
List of shipwrecks: 29 July 1923
Ship	State	Description
Ferrera	United Kingdom	The cargo ship caught fire 10 nautical miles (19 km) east of Sabang, Netherlands East Indies and was abandoned. Her crew were rescued by Namwah (flag unknown).

== 31 July ==
List of shipwrecks: 31 July 1923
Ship	State	Description
Drammen	Norway	The cargo ship caught fire at Gravesend, Kent and was beached.
