= List of shipwrecks in August 1923 =

The list of shipwrecks in August 1923 includes ships sunk, foundered, grounded, or otherwise lost during August 1923.

== 1 August ==
List of shipwrecks: 1 August 1923
Ship	State	Description
Magicstar	United Kingdom	The cargo ship ran aground in the Yangtze 10 nautical miles (19 km) downstream of Kiukiang, China. She was refloated on 4 August.

== 2 August ==
List of shipwrecks: 2 August 1923
Ship	State	Description
Citriana	United Kingdom	The passenger ship struck a rock and foundered at Kilindini, Kenya. All on board were rescued.
Richard Welford	United Kingdom	The cargo ship capsized at Newcastle upon Tyne, Northumberland.

== 3 August ==
List of shipwrecks: 3 August 1923
Ship	State	Description
Dina Accame	Italy	The cargo ship caught fire and sank at Genoa, Liguria.
Maria M.	Italy	The ship collided with Napoli (Italy) in the Bay of Naples and sank.

== 6 August ==
List of shipwrecks: 6 August 1923
Ship	State	Description
Thursby	United Kingdom	The collier foundered 10 nautical miles (19 km) north north east of the Longships Lighthouse.
Tudorstar	United Kingdom	The cargo ship ran aground in the Paraná River, Argentina. She was refloated on 11 August.

== 8 August ==
List of shipwrecks: 8 August 1923
Ship	State	Description
Aberdeen	United States	The 48-gross register ton, 52.1-foot (15.9 m) fishing vessel was destroyed by fire on the north end of Gravina Island in the Alexander Archipelago in Southeast Alaska.
Baron Blantyre	United Kingdom	The cargo ship departed Port Natal, South Africa for Adelaide, South Australia. Presumed foundered with the loss of all hands.
Saian Maru	Japan	The ship sailed on this date, no further trace.
San Giuseppe	Italy	The cargo ship ran aground in the Strait of Canso. She was refloated on 14 August.

== 10 August ==
List of shipwrecks: 10 August 1923
Ship	State	Description
Nyland	Sweden	The cargo ship ran aground near Trelleborg, Skåne County. She was refloated on 13 August.

== 13 August ==
List of shipwrecks: 13 August 1923
Ship	State	Description
Inverspey	United Kingdom	The sold off Castle class trawler ran aground in dense fog on rocks on the northwest shore of Inishmore, Aran Islands, in Galway Bay, Ireland and declared a total loss.
Sable Island	United Kingdom	The cargo liner ran aground at Lamaline, Newfoundland. Her passengers were taken off on 14 August. She was refloated on 24 August.

== 16 August ==
List of shipwrecks: 16 August 1923
Ship	State	Description
Douglas	Isle of Man	The passenger ship collided with Artemisia (United Kingdom) in the River Mersey at Liverpool, Lancashire. All on board were rescued before she sank. The wreck was cleared in December.

== 18 August ==
List of shipwrecks: 18 August 1923
Ship	State	Description
Ginyo Maru	Japan	The cargo ship sank at Hong Kong during a typhoon.
HMS L9	Royal Navy	The L-class submarine sank at Hong Kong during a typhoon. She was salvaged on 6 September, repaired and returned to service.
Loongsang	United Kingdom	The cargo ship foundered in a typhoon at Hong Kong with the loss of 25 lives.
Mylie	United Kingdom	The cargo ship foundered during a typhoon with the loss of all but one of her crew. The survivor was rescued by Sin Kiang (United Kingdom) on 30 August. She was on a voyage from Chinwangtao to Shanghai, China.
Sekino Maru	Japan	The cargo ship sank at Hong Kong during a typhoon.

== 19 August ==
List of shipwrecks: 19 August 1923
Ship	State	Description
Changsha	United Kingdom	The refrigerated cargo liner was driven onto the Tiji Tiji Reef, off Simunul, Tawi-Tawi, Philippines. Her passengers were rescued by Victoria (United Kingdom). She was refloated on 23 September.
Leicester	United Kingdom	The cargo ship ran aground at Chicoutimi, Quebec, Canada. She was refloated on 22 August.
Samson	United States	The 11-gross register ton, 33.4-foot (10.2 m) fishing vessel was destroyed by fire at Cape Augustine (54°57′N 133°10′W) on Dall Island in the Alexander Archipelago in Southeast Alaska. Her three-man crew survived.
Sergei	United Kingdom	The cargo ship collided with Juno (United Kingdom) in the North Sea off Grimsby, Lincolnshire and sank.

== 21 August ==
List of shipwrecks: 21 August 1923
Ship	State	Description
Submarine No. 70	Imperial Japanese Navy	The Ro-29-class submarine foundered in the Seto Inland Sea off Awaji Island with the loss of 90 of her 95 crew. Salvage operations began in October.

== 22 August ==
List of shipwrecks: 22 August 1923
Ship	State	Description
Onega	United Kingdom	The cargo ship ran aground on the Khaces Shoal, off Kristinestad, Finland. She was refloated on 30 August.

== 23 August ==
List of shipwrecks: 23 August 1923
Ship	State	Description
Airston	United Kingdom	The cargo ship was discovered abandoned in the English Channel by Ben Henshaw and Ben Johnson (both United Kingdom) and was towed into Portland, Dorset.

== 24 August ==
List of shipwrecks: 24 August 1923
Ship	State	Description
Braebeg	United Kingdom	The coaster struck a submerged wreck ay Ballyhack, County Wexford and was beached.

== 25 August ==
List of shipwrecks: 25 August 1923
Ship	State	Description
Gutenfels	Germany	The cargo ship ran aground at Guadalmesí Point, Spain. She was abandoned as a total loss on 14 September.

== 26 August ==
List of shipwrecks: 26 August 1923
Ship	State	Description
España	Armada Española	The España-class battleship ran aground at Cape Tres Forcas, Spanish Morocco. She broke in two in November and was declared a total loss.

== 27 August ==
List of shipwrecks: 27 August 1923
Ship	State	Description
Thursby	United Kingdom	The coaster foundered in the Irish Sea 40 nautical miles (74 km) north east of the Longships Lighthouse with the loss of one of her thirteen crew.

== 29 August ==
List of shipwrecks: 29 August 1923
Ship	State	Description
Glyndwr	United Kingdom	The cargo ship passed Dungeness, Kent for Porto, Portugal. No further trace, presumed foundered with the loss of all hands.

== 30 August ==
List of shipwrecks: 30 August 1923
Ship	State	Description
Deputé Emile Driant		The collier capsized and sank in the English Channel off boulogne, Pas-de-Calais with the loss of nineteen of her 24 crew.
Klüpfel	Germany	The cargo ship foundered in the North Sea with the loss of all but one of her crew. The survivor was rescued by a Dutch fishing vessel.
Rawlinson	United Kingdom	The cargo ship foundered in the North Sea. A lifeboat from the ship was recovered by a German trawler on 10 September. All hands lost.

== 31 August ==
List of shipwrecks: 31 August 1923
Ship	State	Description
Sheikh Berkhud	Egypt	The cargo ship sank at Suez.
