= August 1923 =

Month of 1923

| << | August 1923 | | | | | >> |
| Su | Mo | Tu | We | Th | Fr | Sa |
| | | | 1 | 2 | 3 | 4 |
| 5 | 6 | 7 | 8 | 9 | 10 | 11 |
| 12 | 13 | 14 | 15 | 16 | 17 | 18 |
| 19 | 20 | 21 | 22 | 23 | 24 | 25 |
| 26 | 27 | 28 | 29 | 30 | 31 |

The following events occurred in August 1923:

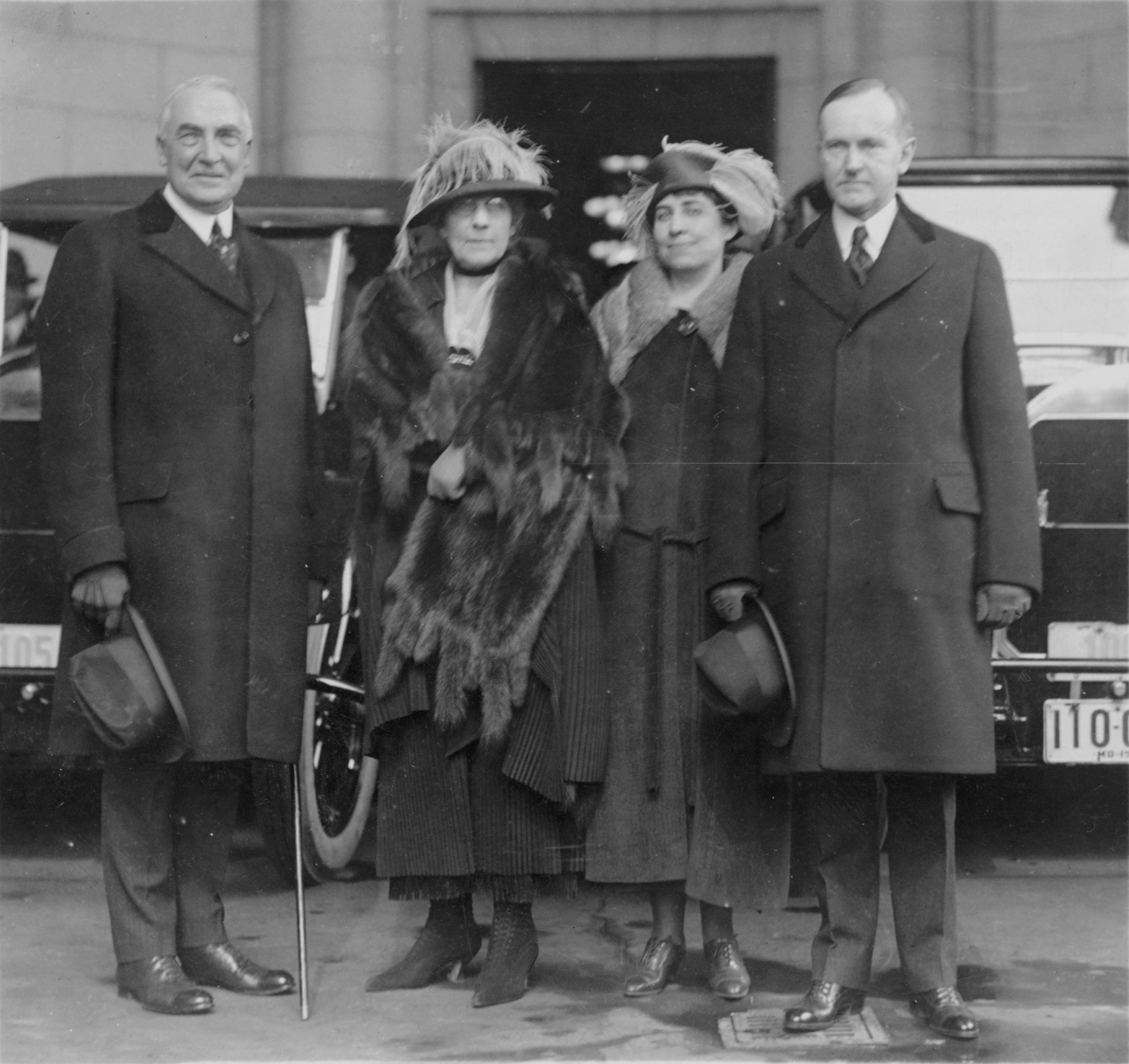
August 2, 1923: U.S. President Warren G. Harding (far left) dies suddenly at San Francisco hotel, Vice President Calvin Coolidge sworn in the next day

== August 1, 1923 (Wednesday) ==
- A medical bulletin from President Harding's physicians reported from San Francisco that there was a "slight improvement in the lung condition" but no change otherwise. A followup report said that he had eaten two soft-boiled eggs for breakfast and had "a slight and only slight attack of indigestion" that "was more than overbalanced by the decline of the President's temperature to normal for the first time." At the same time, committees in San Francisco and Los Angeles agreed to turn over the remaining expenses associated with entertainment during Harding's tour "to a state fund to provide everything necessary for the comfort of President Harding" during his convalescence, including the lease of a private home "in the cool and bracing atmosphere close to San Francisco" during August.
- A parade of the Ku Klux Klan drew a crowd of 100,000 people in Lima, Ohio.
- The silent historical drama Little Old New York, based on a play of the same name, was released by Goldwyn Pictures, and cast Marion Davies and Harrison Ford (a star of the 1920s and no relation to the more successful star of later decades) as a daughter and a stepson competing for a large inheritance. Produced by newspaper mogul William Randolph Hearst, the film was one of the 10 most popular in 1923.
- The wife of film comedian Al St. John was granted a divorce in Los Angeles court. "He started drinking in October 1917, and I haven't seen him sober since that time," she testified.
- Born:
  - Carter Brown, English-born Australian detective fiction author; as Alan Geoffrey Yates, in Ilford, London, England (d. 1985)
  - Thelma Forshaw, Australian short story writer and journalist; in Glebe Point, New South Wales, Australia (d. 1995)
- Died: Alexander Y. Malcomson, 58, American businessman who provided the initial financing for the launch of the Ford Motor Company; died of pneumonia (b. 1865)

== August 2, 1923 (Thursday) ==
- United States President Warren G. Harding died at 7:30 p.m. San Francisco time (10:30 Washington time). At 7:51, a statement of "the saddest news that telegraph wires can carry" was sent across the nation, signed by his five physicians: "The President died instantaneously and without warning and while conversing with members of his family at 7:30 p.m. Death was apparently due to some brain involvement, probably due to an apopleptic stroke. During the day he had been free from discomfort, and there was every justification for anticipating a prompt recovery." While the cause of death was officially said at the time to have been from a stroke, it is now more commonly believed to have been from heart failure.
- Konstantin Päts became the Riigivanem or "State Elder" of Estonia for the second time, succeeding Juhan Kukk as the Baltic nation's head of state and head of government.
- The military and economic alliance of France and Poland, signed on February 21, 1921, took effect upon ratification by both nations.
- British Prime Minister Stanley Baldwin told the House of Commons that "If the British people feel that the wounds of Europe were being kept open instead of being healed," by the collection of large reparations from Germany, "there might then easily ensue the last thing in the world that I would like to see," while Ramsay MacDonald said "It is perfectly clear that France is in the Ruhr not for the purpose of getting reparations," but "an attempt to continue war after formal peace has been declared."
- Born:
  - Shimon Peres, Israeli politician and statesman, served as the Prime Minister of Israel in 1977, 1984 to 1986, and 1995 to 1998, then as President of Israel from 2007 to 2014; as Szymon Perski, in Wiszniew, Poland (present-day Vishnyeva, Belarus) (d. 2016)
  - Ike Williams, American professional boxer and world lightweight champion from 1945 to 1951; as Isiah Williams, in Brunswick, Georgia, United States (d. 1994)
- Died:
  - Warren G. Harding, 57, American politician, served as the 29th President of the United States from 1921 until his death; died of heart failure (b. 1865)
  - George Alexander, 83, Scottish-born American politician, served as the 28th Mayor of Los Angeles from 1909 to 1913 (b. 1839)
  - Robert Alexander, 82-83, Scottish artist (b. 1840)
  - Joseph Whitty, 19, Irish republican; died in the Curragh Camp prison hospital after a hunger strike (b. 1904)

== August 3, 1923 (Friday) ==
- The inauguration of Calvin Coolidge as 30th President of the United States was held at the family home in Plymouth Notch, Vermont at 2:47 a.m. Coolidge took the oath of office from his father John Calvin Coolidge, Sr., the local notary public, by the light of a kerosene lamp.
- President Coolidge took a train to Washington and arrived in the nation's capital at 9:10 p.m. after having been driven from Plymouth Notch to Rutland, Vermont, where he boarded a private car at the station and traveled to New York City's Grand Central Station and departing at 4:15 p.m. local time for a nonstop trip to Washington in less than six hours. He then was taken from the Pennsylvania Avenue terminal in a private car. President Coolidge and his wife then went to their suite at the Willard Hotel in Washington, where he had lived since becoming vice president, until the White House could be readied for his arrival.
- The Irish Free State passed the "Defence Forces (Temporary Provisions) Act", to create "an armed force to be called Oglaigh na hEireann (hereinafter referred to as the Forces) consisting of such number of officers, non-commissioned officers, and men as may from time to time be provided" by the parliament. A more permanent force would be established on October 1, 1924.
- The Palacio de las Garzas, the official residence of the president of Panama, was inaugurated with President Belisario Porras Barahona and his family as the first person to live there.
- Baseball commissioner Kenesaw Mountain Landis released a statement which read, "It is the sentiment throughout baseball that no games be played either today nor on the day of the funeral for the late President, and as a further mark of respect for his memory, flags at ball parks will be displayed at half mast until after the burial."
- Born:
  - Jean Hagen, American actress; as Jean Verhagen, in Chicago, Illinois, United States (d. 1977)
  - Pope Shenouda III of Alexandria, Egyptian pope of the Coptic Orthodox Church, as Nazir Gayed Roufail, in Abnub, Kingdom of Egypt (present-day Egypt) (d. 2012)
- Died: Laura Ratcliffe, 87, spy and agent for the Confederate States of America during the American Civil War (b. 1836)

== August 4, 1923 (Saturday) ==
- The Otira Tunnel, at 5.32 miles (8.56 km) the longest tunnel in the British Empire and the seventh-largest in the world at the time, was opened by the Midland Railway Company on South Island in New Zealand.
- Rauf Orbay resigned as Prime Minister of Turkey.
- Calvin Coolidge's first official act as U.S. president was to declare August 10 a day of national mourning and prayer on the occasion of Warren Harding's funeral.
- Sir Arthur Conan Doyle ended his visit to North America, boarding the RMS Adriatic in New York bound for England. "After a period of about three days the spirit of President Harding may, if sought, advise Calvin Coolidge, the nation's new chief executive, wisely and helpfully on the great problems confronting him", Doyle said just before leaving.
- Born:
  - Reg Grundy, Australian TV producer and media mogul; as Reginald Grundy, in Sydney, Australia (d. 2016)
  - Mayme Agnew Clayton, African American museum founder who amassed the largest privately held collection of African American historical materials in the world; in Van Buren, Arkansas, United States (d. 2006)
  - James E. Lewis, African American artist, art collector, and professor whose collection of African art is amassed in the James E. Lewis Museum of Art at Morgan State University; in Phenix, Virginia, United States (d. 1997)
- Died: Blanche Georgiana Vulliamy, 53-54, English artist and writer (b. 1869)

== August 5, 1923 (Sunday) ==
- Iowa Senator Albert B. Cummins proposed a constitutional amendment limiting the president to one term only. "Human frailities are too great to stand the strain which the presidency places on a man," Cummins said. "We should limit the President to one term. It might be made a six year term, but I am not so sure about that even."
- Born:
  - Devan Nair, Singaporean union leader and politician, served as the third President of Singapore from 1981 to 1985; in Malacca, Straits Settlements (present-day Malaysia) (d. 2005)
  - Michael Kerry, British Procurator General and Treasury Solicitor, 1980 to 1984; in Hampstead, London (d. 2012)
- Died: Candace Thurber Wheeler, 96, American business operator and the first major female interior designer, founder of the Society of Decorative Arts in New York, the New York Exchange for Women's Work, the interior decorating firm of Tiffany & Wheeler, and the textile manufacturer Associated Artists (b. 1827)

== August 6, 1923 (Monday) ==
- Manuel Teixeira Gomes was elected President of Portugal by the 194 members of the Congresso da República in a joint session of the Senado and the Câmara dos Deputados on the third ballot. Requiring at least two-thirds of the votes cast, Gomes had 108 of 187 votes (57%) split among five candidates, with former president Bernardino Machado receiving 73. On the next ballot, Gomes had 117 of 200 votes cast (58%) to 71 for Machado. The final ballot was between Gomes and Machado only, with 68 of Machado's supporters casting blank votes and Gomes receiving 121 of the 126 cast.
- Henry Sullivan became the first American to swim the English Channel, accomplishing the feat in 27 hours and 25 minutes.
- The United States and Turkey signed treaties of commerce and extradition.
- Born:
  - Moira Lister, South African stage, film and TV actress and writer; in Cape Town, South Africa (d. 2007)
  - Marisa Merlini, Italian character actress on film; in Rome, Kingdom of Italy (present-day Italy) (d. 2008)

== August 7, 1923 (Tuesday) ==
- German Chancellor Wilhelm Cuno called a conference of the six top party leaders where it was decided to put the country back on a gold basis.
- U.S. President Harding's funeral train reached Washington, D.C. at 10:22 p.m. and his casket was moved to the White House, where it lay overnight in the East Room.
- Born:
  - Margaret Hayman, British educator, co-founder of the British Mathematical Olympiad; as Margaret Crann, in New Earswick, North Yorkshire, England (d. 1994)
  - Victor Nendaka Bika, Congolese politician, director of the national police and intelligence agency of the Democratic Republic of Congo from 1960 to 1965; in Kumu, Bas-Uele District, Belgian Congo (present-day Democratic Republic of the Congo) (d. 2002)
  - Licinio de la Fuente, Spanish politician, served as Labor Minister from 1969 to 1975; in Noez, Spain (d. 2015)

== August 8, 1923 (Wednesday) ==
- The state funeral for the late president Warren G. Harding was held in the United States Capitol rotunda
- The Irish Free State parliament created the national police force, the Garda Síochána.
- Born:
  - Eve Miller, American actress; as Marilyn Miller, in Los Angeles, United States (d. 1973, committed suicide)
  - Latifa al-Zayyat, Egyptian activist and writer known for her 1960 novel The Open Door; in Damietta, Kingdom of Egypt (present-day Egypt) (d. 1996)

== August 9, 1923 (Thursday) ==
- The 3rd Dáil, convened on September 9, 1922, as the Provisional Parliament of Southern Ireland in accordance with the Anglo-Irish Treaty and the creation of the Irish Free State, was dissolved by King George V of the United Kingdom at the request of Prime Minister W. T. Cosgrave. Elections for a new parliament were scheduled by Cosgrave for August 27.
- Thousands of stores in Berlin closed, and their owners went on strike, in an attempt to force Wilhelm Cuno from office.
- Born: Ned Martin, American sportscaster; as Edwin Martin III, in Wayne, Pennsylvania, United States (d. 2002)
- Died: Petar Angelov, 45, Bulgarian military officer and terrorist with Bulgaria's IMRO; killed by members of a rival IMRO faction on orders of Todor Aleksandrov (b. 1878)

== August 10, 1923 (Friday) ==
- The late President Warren G. Harding was interred in the Marion Cemetery Receiving Vault in his hometown of Marion, Ohio.
- German President Friedrich Ebert issued a proclamation outlawing the circulation of pamphlets calling for the overthrow of the government or acts of violence. The penalty was three years' imprisonment or a fine of up to 500 million marks.
- Born: S. M. Sultan, Bangladesh artist; as Sheikh Mohammed Sultan, in Machimdia village, Bengal Province, British India (present-day Bangladesh) (d. 1994)
- Died: Joaquín Sorolla, 60, Spanish painter (b. 1863)

== August 11, 1923 (Saturday) ==
- The first fossil of a velociraptor was discovered, in the course of an expedition by the American Museum of Natural History to the Flaming Cliffs in the Gobi Desert of Mongolia. (1924). Peter Kaisen discovered the fossil of the crushed but complete skull of Velociraptor mongoliensis, which had been extinct for at least 71 million years.
- The Cuno strikes broke out across Germany as opposition to Wilhelm Cuno hardened. 35 workers were killed and 100 wounded around the country.
- The Social Democratic Party of Germany withdrew its support for Cuno.

== August 12, 1923 (Sunday) ==
- Wilhelm Cuno resigned as Chancellor of Germany after losing a vote of no confidence. Gustav Stresemann accepted President Friedrich Ebert's offer to form a new government.
- The Trotsky Red Stadium opened in Kiev in the Ukrainian SSR with the ceremonies of the Second All-Ukrainian Spartakiad.
- Clarence Saunders announced that he was relinquishing control of the Piggly Wiggly supermarket chain after a failed gamble with Piggly Wiggly stocks cost him his entire fortune.
- Argentine swimmer Enrique Tirabocchi swam the English Channel in a record 16 hours 33 minutes.
- The 1,000th asteroid to be discovered from Earth, 1000 Piazzia, was found by German astronomer Karl Reinmuth from the Heidelberg Observatory.
- Born: Gordon Samuels, British-born Australian lawyer, served as the Governor of New South Wales from 1996 to 2001; in London, England (d. 2007)

== August 13, 1923 (Monday) ==
- Gustav Stresemann became the new Chancellor of Germany as well as the new Foreign Minister.
- Poland's newly completed port at Gdynia received its first ship, France's Compagnie Générale Transatlantique (CGT) liner Kentucky, which diverted to Gdynia because of a strike of longshoremen at Danzig (now Gdańsk). "Le Kentucky" reportedly "unloaded a live cargo of horses, and took 1,800 emigrants to Le Havre."
- The Bucareli Treaty was signed between Mexico and the United States, with Mexico's government to compensate U.S. companies for financial losses sustained during the Mexican Revolution, in return for U.S. recognition of the government of President Álvaro Obregón. The negotiations and ceremony took place at the Mexican Office of Interior Affairs government building located on Avenida Bucareli No. 85 in Mexico City.
- The Brazilian luxury hotel Belmond Copacabana Palace was opened in Rio de Janeiro.
- The Washington Elm tree was officially pronounced dead.

== August 14, 1923 (Tuesday) ==
- A coal mine explosion at the Kemmerer Coal Company killed 99 miners near Kemmerer, Wyoming. The toll might have been higher but for the fact that nearly half of the usual force (115 out of 250 miners) were off for a holiday. An investigation determined that a fire boss had apparently attempted to relight his flame safety lamp by striking a match.
- British Marine Air Navigation Co Ltd, the world's first scheduled passenger flying boat service, made its first flight, departing from Woolston, Southampton to an airstrip on the Channel Islands.
- After members of the Ku Klux Klan beat and mutilated an accused drug peddler in Tulsa, Oklahoma, Governor Jack C. Walton declared martial law in the city and county of Tulsa.
- Born:
  - Kuldip Nayar, Indian journalist and High Commissioner to the U.K. in 1990; in Sialkot, Punjab Province, British India (present-day Pakistan) (d. 2018)
  - John Pozdro, American musical composer; in Chicago, United States (d. 2009)

== August 15, 1923 (Wednesday) ==
- A series of tidal waves killed at least 346 people on the western coast of Korea, and 1,000 were missing after 25,000 homes near the Yalu River were submerged in waves and flooding.
- The first United States Navy Reserve air station was founded by U.S. Navy Lieutenant Richard E. Byrd and other people near Boston as Naval Air Station Squantum.
- Irish Free State troops arrested Éamon de Valera, referred to within the anti-Treaty faction of Sinn Féin as "President of the Irish Republic", as just as he began making a speech to his constituents at Ennis in County Clare in advance of the August 27 elections.
- A brawl involving 2,000 people broke out in Steubenville, Ohio when a banquet held in a hotel by the Ku Klux Klan was broken up by a mob swinging clubs and throwing bricks and bottles.
- Grigori Zinoviev, the Soviet Russian Chairman of the international communist organization Comintern, instructed Chairman Heinrich Brandler of the Kommunistische Partei Deutschlands (KPD, the Communist Party of Germany) to prepare to launch a Communist revolution in October.

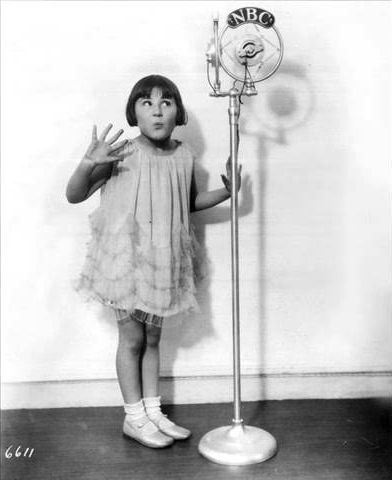
Rose Marie in 1930

- Born:
  - Rose Marie, American radio and TV actress and comedian; as Rose Marie Mazzetta, in New York City, United States (d. 2017)
  - Rocheforte Lafayette Weeks, Liberian academic and diplomat, served as President of the University of Liberia from 1959 to 1972 and Foreign Minister of Liberia from 1972 to 1973; in Crozerville, Liberia (d. 1986)
  - Winona Beamer, American educator and proponent of the preservation of Hawaiian culture, including the hula dance; in Honolulu, Territory of Hawaii, United States (present-day Hawaii) (d. 2008)
- Died: Virginia González Polo, 50, Spanish feminist and Communist, co-founder of the Spanish Communist Workers' Party (Partido Comunista Obrero Español or PCOE) in 1921; died after a long illness (b. 1873)

== August 16, 1923 (Thursday) ==
- Viscount Jellicoe, the Governor-General of New Zealand was designated as the Governor of the Ross Dependency in Antarctica with the publication in New Zealand's government gazette of the British government's July 30 Order in Council. Jellicoe subsequently extended New Zealand law to the Antarctic territory.
- At the annual amateur bullfight in the French resort of Arles, four people were killed and 25 injured when an angry bull leaped over a barrier and charged at young men wishing to demonstrate their skill. A panicked crowd ran upward into the grandstand, which then collapsed under their weight.
- The leader of 70,000 workers in the Braunschweig region of Germany threatened to seize the government if their demands were not met.
- Born:
  - Millôr Fernandes, Brazilian cartoonist and playwright; as Milton Viola Fernandes, in Rio de Janeiro, Brazil (d. 2012)
  - Jack Aeby, American nuclear physicist and photographer; in Mound City, Missouri, United States (d. 2015)

== August 17, 1923 (Friday) ==
- The Home Bank of Canada closed its doors, wiping out the savings of thousands of Canadians. The bank's collapse would become the subject of a government inquiry.
- Ratifications of the Washington Naval Treaty of February 6, 1922, were exchanged in Washington, D.C. by representatives of the U.S., UK, France, Italy and Japan, putting its terms into effect The Anglo-Japanese Alliance, agreed upon by Britain and Japan on January 30, 1902, was officially terminated upon the ratification of the Four-Power Treaty of 1921.
- The Prime Minister of France, Raymond Poincaré, announced his willingness to reduce the amount of war reparations demanded from Germany. The statement came in a reply to an aggressive note from Britain's Foreign Secretary, Lord Curzon.
- Born:
  - Ivan Suchkov, Soviet Russian fighter pilot with 10 shootdowns of U.S. and United Nations aircraft during the Korean War; in Besskorbnaya, Russian SFSR, Soviet Union (present-day Russia) (d. 1981)
  - Juanita Morrow Nelson, American pacifist and co-founder of the Peacemakers organization; in Cleveland, United States (d. 2015)

== August 18, 1923 (Saturday) ==
- A typhoon killed more than 200 people at Macao, Portugal's colony on the mainland of China, with boats being capsized in the Macao harbor and buildings collapsing in the city from high winds and waves.
- At least 12 people were killed in the collapse of a church in the Spanish village of Navarredonda de la Rinconada, and 30 more were injured. The dead and injured were part of a crowd of 100 people who had climbed on top of the church roof to watch a bullfight in a bullring near the church.
- Czechoslovakia and France signed a new trade pact.
- Helen Wills won the U.S. national tennis championship at the U.S. National, beating defending U.S. champion Molla Mallory in straight sets at Forest Hills, New York, 6-2 and 6–1.

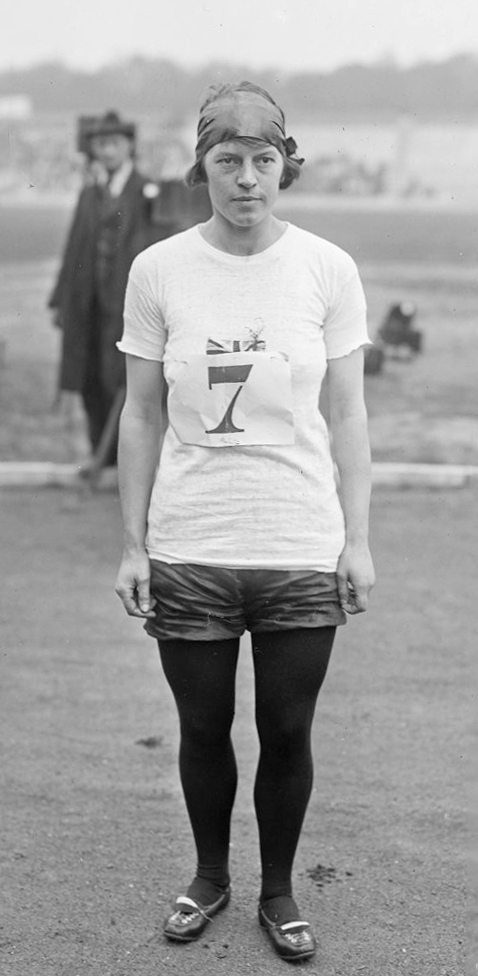
Sports superstar Mary Lines

- The first British track and field championships for women were held by the Women's Amateur Athletic Association, taking place at the OXO Sport Grounds at Downham, London. Female athletes competed in 11 events, with members of the Polytechnic Ladies Athletic Club winning eight of the gold medals, four of which went to Mary Lines.
- Born:
  - Ardeshir Tarapore, Indian military officer; in Bombay, British India (present-day India) (d. 1965)
  - Claude Weaver III, American-born Royal Canadian Air Force ace during World War II who was shot down and escaped a German POW camp, then shot down a second time and killed; in Oklahoma City, United States (d. 1944)
- Died: Ewald O. Stiehm, 37, American football and basketball coach and college athletics administrator; died of stomach cancer (b. 1886)

== August 19, 1923 (Sunday) ==
- The ordeal of Ada Delutuk Blackjack, the last survivor of five people who had been marooned on Wrangel Island above the Arctic Circle since September 15, 1921, ended as a rescue team arrived and returned her to Alaska. Harold Noice, leading the rescue expedition on the schooner Donaldson, reached the island after starting on August 2. Blackjack had been the only Iñupiat (Alaskan native) on the expedition, hired as a cook for four men who were sent by Vilhjalmur Stefansson to claim Wrangel Island for Canada. Three of the men (Milton Galle, Fred Maurer and Allan Crawford) had departed on January 28 in an attempt to get supplies from Siberia, leaving Lorne Knight and Blackjack behind. Galle, Maurer and Crawford were never seen again, and Knight died on June 23. The island is now part of the territory of Russia.
- German electrical engineer Charles Proteus Steinmetz said that by 2023, electricity would be doing all the hard work and people would not have to toil for more than four hours a day. Steinmetz also envisioned cities free of pollution and litter in a century's time.
- Eight people died in forest fires along the French Riviera.
- Lord Rothermere, in an editorial in his Sunday Pictorial, entreated Britain to preserve the Entente with France. "Europe without an entente is bound to mean an immense growth in armaments", he wrote. "We will have to resort at once to conscription without waiting for the outbreak of hostilities."
- Born:
  - Zoltán Gera, Hungarian film actor; in Szeged, Kingdom of Hungary (present-day Hungary) (d. 2014)
  - Tashi Dorgi, Bhutanese royal princess (Ashi) and diplomat for the mountain kingdom of Bhutan; in Kalimpong, Bengal Province, British India (present-day India)
  - Ken McKenzie, Canadian sports journalist who served as publicity director of the National Hockey League from 1946 to 1963; in Winnipeg, Canada (d. 2003)
- Died: Vilfredo Pareto, 75, French-born Italian economist known for the Pareto distribution, the Pareto efficiency, and the Pareto principle (b. 1848)

== August 20, 1923 (Monday) ==
- The U.S. Navy airship U.S.S. Shenandoah, the first rigid airship to use helium for its buoyancy rather than the less expensive, but flammable hydrogen, was lifted off inside its immense hangar at the Naval Air Station at Lakehurst, New Jersey. Based on the tests for controlling the ship, a powered flight was approved to take place on September 24.
- One of the last train robberies in the United States was carried out by the Kimes–Terrill Gang and the Al Spencer gang, with Frank Nash stopping a train on the Missouri–Kansas–Texas Railroad ("the Katy") line near Okemah, Oklahoma, and robbing it of $20,000 in cash and bonds.
- Mines and metal industries were shut down in the Ruhr and Rhineland by a new wave of strikes.
- A streetcar ride in Berlin cost 100,000 marks, ten times what it cost two weeks earlier.
- The seven-week dockworker's strike ended in England.
- Brothers Lee Shubert and J. J. Shubert staged the Broadway revue Artists and Models, emphasizing "girls in various stages of undress" and the first to feature topless or fully nude females on a Broadway stage. Vaudeville comedian Frank Fay was the host at the Shubert Theatre and would run for 312 performances.
- Born:
  - Jim Reeves, American country music singer-songwriter; as James Reeves, in Galloway, Texas, United States (d. 1964, killed in plane crash)
  - Romeo A. Horton, Liberian economist and banker, founder of the Bank of Liberia and later the African nation's Secretary of Commerce, Industry and Labor; in Monrovia, Liberia (d. 2005)

== August 21, 1923 (Tuesday) ==
- Off the coast of Japan, 88 men were killed during sea trials of Imperial Japanese Navy's Submarine Number 70. The dead included 42 shipyard workers along with 46 Navy personnel, and only the commanding officer and five other men survived. The sub was diving in the Seto Inland Sea near Awaji Island when a hatch was opened prematurely, and the wake of a passing ship swamped her.
- A second swearing-in ceremony was held for U.S. President Calvin Coolidge, 19 days after he had been sworn in by his father, a Vermont notary public, on August 2. Because of the question of whether the presidential oath had to be administered by a federal official, Judge Adolph A. Hoehling Jr. of the United States District Court for the District of Columbia administered the oath to Coolidge at the Willard Hotel. After the ceremony, the Coolidges moved from the hotel to the White House.
- France delivered an official note to Britain in which it refused to make any concessions on the occupation of the Ruhr.
- The city of Kalamazoo, Michigan passed an ordinance forbidding a dancers to stare into their partners' eyes.
- The town of Spindale, North Carolina, named for the fact that it was the home of several textile mills, was incorporated.
- Born:
  - Mario Laserna Pinzón, Colombian educator and founder of the University of Los Andes; in Paris, France (d. 2013)
  - Chris Schenkel, American sportscaster; in Bippus, Indiana, United States (d. 2005)

== August 22, 1923 (Wednesday) ==
- Spain's war department announced it had landed 5,000 new troops in Morocco for a broad new offensive in the Rif War.
- Sloppy Thurston of the Chicago White Sox threw an immaculate inning, striking out all three Philadelphia Athletics on nine total pitches in the 12th inning; it was the first major-league immaculate inning to occur in extra innings.
- Born:
  - Hidehiko Yamabe, Japanese mathematician known for solving Hilbert's fifth problem and for the Yamabe flow; in Ashiya, Hyōgo prefecture, Empire of Japan (present-day Japan) (d. 1960)
  - Ramswaroop Verma, Indian opponent of the caste system and founder of Arjak Sangh; in Cawnpore, United Provinces of British India, British India (present-day Kanpur, Uttar Pradesh, India) (d. 1998)
- Died: Daniel Best, 85, American farmer and inventor of farm equipment, including the combine harvester and the portable grain cleaner/separator (b. 1838)

== August 23, 1923 (Thursday) ==
- The Grand National Assembly of Turkey ratified the Treaty of Lausanne after it had been signed on July 24. In accordance with the terms of the treaty, the occupation of Constantinople (now Istanbul) wound down as the British, French and Italian troops began their withdrawal, which would be completed by October 4.
- German Finance Minister Rudolf Hilferding told the Reichstag that he planned to introduce heavy taxation as the only way to save the country.
- In a secret meeting of the Politburo of the Soviet Union's Communist Party, Leon Trotsky persuaded the leaders to approve a plan to finance the Communist Party of Germany (Kommunistische Partei Deutschlands or KPD) overthrow of the German government. Karl Radek, Józef Unszlicht, Vasily Schmidt and Georgy Pyatakov, German-speaking members of the Party's Central Committee, were dispatched to Berlin to assist the KPD in planning a revolution to take place in October, with the goal of an industrial "Soviet Germany" to develop the mostly agrarian economy of the USSR.
- Paavo Nurmi of Finland shattered the 1916 record of Norman Taber (4:12.6) for fastest mile, finishing in 4 minutes, 10.4 seconds at a meet in Stockholm.
- The romantic comedy film Bluebeard's 8th Wife, starring Gloria Swanson, was released.
- Born: Henry F. Warner, American soldier and Medal of Honor recipient; in Troy, North Carolina, United States (d. 1944)
- Died:
  - Giovanni Minzoni, 38, Italian priest who opposed the regime of Benito Mussolini; murdered in Argenta by two enforcers of the Fascist Party who fractured his skull and beat him to death with clubs, apparently on orders from Italo Balbo (b. 1885)
  - Henry C. Mustin, 49, American naval aviator who established the first Naval Air Station for the U.S. Navy, organizing what is now NAS Pensacola in Florida; died of heart disease (b. 1874)
  - Oliver King, 68, British classical music composer (b. 1855)

== August 24, 1923 (Friday) ==
- Katō Tomosaburō, 62, Prime Minister of Japan since June 12, 1922, died after a short illness. Viscount Uchida Kōsai, the Foreign Minister, served as acting premier until a permanent prime minister could form a new cabinet of ministers. Admiral Yamamoto Gonnohyōe was selected by the Prince Regent Hirohito to attempt formation of a new cabinet.
- The Reichsministerium für die besetzten Gebiete (Ministry for Occupied Territories) was created in Germany by President Friedrich Ebert to administer the portion of the Ruhr Valley occupied by French and Belgium troops, with Johannes Fuchs serving as the Minister under Chancellor Gustav Stresemann. On the same day, Stresemann offered France a share in German industry in exchange for ending the occupation of territory.
- Right fielder Jackie Gallagher and pitcher Johnson Fry, both of whom had a career batting average of 1.000 in Major League Baseball, both appeared for the Cleveland Indians in a 20 to 8 loss at home to the Washington Senators. Fry and Gallagher were among 17 players put into the game by Cleveland, which used five pitchers in the game. For both men, the event was their only MLB game and each got a hit the only at-bat in their careers, for a perfect batting average.
- Born:
  - Homi Sethna, Indian nuclear scientist and chemical engineer, served as the Chairman of the Indian Atomic Energy Commission who guided the development of India's first nuclear bomb; in Bombay, British India (present-day Mumbai, India) (d. 2010)
  - Arthur Jensen, American educational psychologist known for his controversial theories on race and intelligence; in San Diego, California, United States (d. 2012)
- Died:
  - David Benton Jones, 74-75, Welsh-born American industrialist who acquired control of the manufacture of zinc and became one of the wealthiest men in the U.S. (b. c. 1848)
  - Kate Douglas Wiggin, 66, American novelist (b. 1856)

== August 25, 1923 (Saturday) ==
- The Greek government ratified the Convention Concerning the Exchange of Greek and Turkish Populations, two days after the Turkish government had ratified it, clearing the way for the involuntary transfer of 1.5 million Orthodox Christians from Turkey to Greece and 500,000 Greek Muslims to Turkey.
- Violence broke out in Carnegie, Pennsylvania between citizens of the heavily Catholic community and the Ku Klux Klan. The mayor of Carnegie had stopped the KKK from being allowed to march in the town, but 10,000 Klansmen came out to hold a rally on a nearby hill and then about half of them began moving towards Carnegie anyway. The locals threw stones and a Klansman was shot dead; about a dozen arrests were made.
- Germany decided to put all workers on the gold basis rate.

== August 26, 1923 (Sunday) ==
- A group of six young men became the first persons to climb to the top of the 7,795 feet (2,376 m) Mount Washington volcano in the U.S. state of Oregon.
- The South African administrators of South-West Africa (now Namibia) permitted the Herero people to conduct an elaborate burial ceremony for Namibian hero Samuel Maharero at the city of Okahandja. August 26 would continue to be observed annually as a celebration of national pride.
- French Prime Minister Raymond Poincaré rejected Gustav Stresemann's offer of two days previous. "What we did fifty-three years ago, our former enemies can at least try to do today", Poincaré said, referring to the French indemnity after the Franco-Prussian War. "If not, they force us to execute on them what they menaced us with then – pay us or we stay."
- Peggy-Jean Montgomery, the 4-year-old star of the Principal Pictures Corporation who was billed as "Baby Peggy", was signed to the largest contract for a child actress up to that time, with one million dollars (about $15 million a century later) over a three-year period.
- Born:
  - Antonio Brancaccio, Italian jurist and chief justice of the Corte Suprema di Cassazione from 1986 to 1995; in Maddaloni, Kingdom of Italy (present-day Italy) (d. 1995)
  - Wolfgang Sawallisch, German conductor and pianist; in Munich, Germany (d. 2013)
- Died:
  - Rayko Daskalov, 36, exiled Bulgarian politician; shot to death in Prague by Yordan Tsitsonkov, an agent of Bulgaria's terrorist Internal Macedonian Revolutionary Organisation (IMRO) (b. 1886)
  - Hertha Ayrton, 69, British physicist, mathematician and inventor known for her patents on arc lamps, electrodes, and divider calipers (b. 1854)

== August 27, 1923 (Monday) ==
- The Irish Free State held its first parliamentary election since the State's founding, for 153 seats in the 4th Dáil. The Cumann na nGaedheal party, led by Prime Minister W. T. Cosgrave, won 63 seats, while the Irish Republicans led by Éamon de Valera received 44. Although Cosgrave's party was 14 fewer than the required 77 for a majority, the Republicans elected refused to participate in the Dáil, and the Farmers' Party joined a coalition.
- Italian Army General Enrico Tellini, inspecting the disputed border between Greece and Albania as part of a League of Nations mission, was shot and killed in an ambush along with three officers and an interpreter. On the Greek side of the border, between the town of Ioannina and the crossing at the Albanian town of Kakavijë, Tellini's automobile was stopped by a fallen tree and the group was killed. The Italian government blamed Greece for the killing, leading to the Corfu incident on August 31.
- Neville Chamberlain took over from Stanley Baldwin as British Chancellor of the Exchequer.
- Born: Hun Neang, Cambodian monk, father of Prime Minister Hun Sen and Grand Order of National Merit recipient; in Peam Koh Sna, Kampong Cham province, French Indochina (present-day Cambodia) (d. 2013)

== August 28, 1923 (Tuesday) ==
- Germany's government offered to end their passive resistance campaign in the Ruhr in exchange for the release of deportees and prisoners and a guarantee of the "safety of life and subsistence of the Ruhr population."
- U.S. Army pilots Lowell Smith and John Richter broke aviation endurance records by staying in the air for 37 consecutive hours over Rockwell Field in San Diego. Mid-air refueling was used to accomplish the feat.
- Japan's Crown Prince Hirohito moved into the Akasaka Palace, intending to stay only temporarily, but would remain there for five years until two months before his coronation, because the Tokyo earthquake leveled available housing four days later on September 1.
- Groundbreaking was held to start construction of the Parliament House of Australia in Canberra.
- Ex-Pennsylvania governor William Cameron Sproul suggested that Prohibition hastened the death of Warren G. Harding. "I think President Harding's death was accelerated by the fact that he thought it was his duty, because of Prohibition, to set a public example and abstain", Sproul said. "He was accustomed to an occasional drink of scotch. I was his personal friend and I know, and in that laborious task of a trip to Alaska, I'm sure he missed it."
- The trademark for Lincoln Logs, the notched wooden toys patented by John Lloyd Wright on August 31, 1920, was registered.
- Died:
  - Nathan Kaplan, 32, American gangster known as "Kid Dropper;" shot to death by hit man Louis Cohen while being transferred by a police car in New York City after his arrest (b. 1891)
  - Vilma Lwoff-Parlaghy, 60, Hungarian-born American portrait painter, who signed her work as "Princess Lwoff-Parlaghy" based on her brief marriage to Russian Prince Georgy Lvov (b. 1863)

== August 29, 1923 (Wednesday) ==
- Italy delivered a seven-point ultimatum to Greece demanding satisfaction over the recent murder of Italy's General Tellini, with the Greek government given 24 hours to agree to pay 50 million lire reparations, a full inquiry, execution of the killers, an official apology, and a funeral and military honors for the victims. The next day, Greece replied with a four-point counterproposal refusing to pay the indemnity, but agreeing to an expression of sorrow, a memorial service and honors to the victims remains.
- The 12,807 feet (3,904 m) high Granite Peak in the U.S. state of Montana was scaled for the first time, with Elers Koch, James C. Whitham, and R.T. Ferguson making the ascent.
- The 12,519 feet (3,816 m) high South Teton mountain in the U.S. state of Wyoming was scaled for the first time, with mountain climbers Albert R. Ellingwood and Eleanor Davis making the first ascent. Later in the day, Ellingwood became the first person to climb the 12,809 feet (3,904 m) high Middle Teton mountain.
- Junior featherweight boxing champion Jack "Kid" Wolfe lost his world title in a 15-round decision against Carl Duane in a bout at Queensboro Stadium in New York City.
- Born:
  - Esmeralda Agoglia, Argentine ballerina; in Buenos Aires, Argentina (d. 2014)
  - Sir Richard Attenborough, English film actor and director; in Cambridge, Cambridgeshire, England (d. 2014)
  - Marmaduke Hussey, British journalist, served as the chairman of the Board of the BBC from 1986 to 1996; in Surrey, England (d. 2006)
  - Janet Taylor Spence, American psychologist and founder of the Association for Psychological Science; in Toledo, Ohio, United States (d. 2015)
  - Edward Irons, American economist and founding dean of the Howard University School of Business, as well as organizer of the first African American chartered bank, after the Great Depression in the U.S.; in Hulbert, Oklahoma, United States (d. 2022)
- Died:
  - Bernard Durning, 30, American silent film director; died of typhoid fever (b. 1893)
  - Princess Anastasia, 45, American-born heiress and member of the Greek royal family through her marriage to Prince Christopher of Greece; died of cancer (b. 1878)

== August 30, 1923 (Thursday) ==
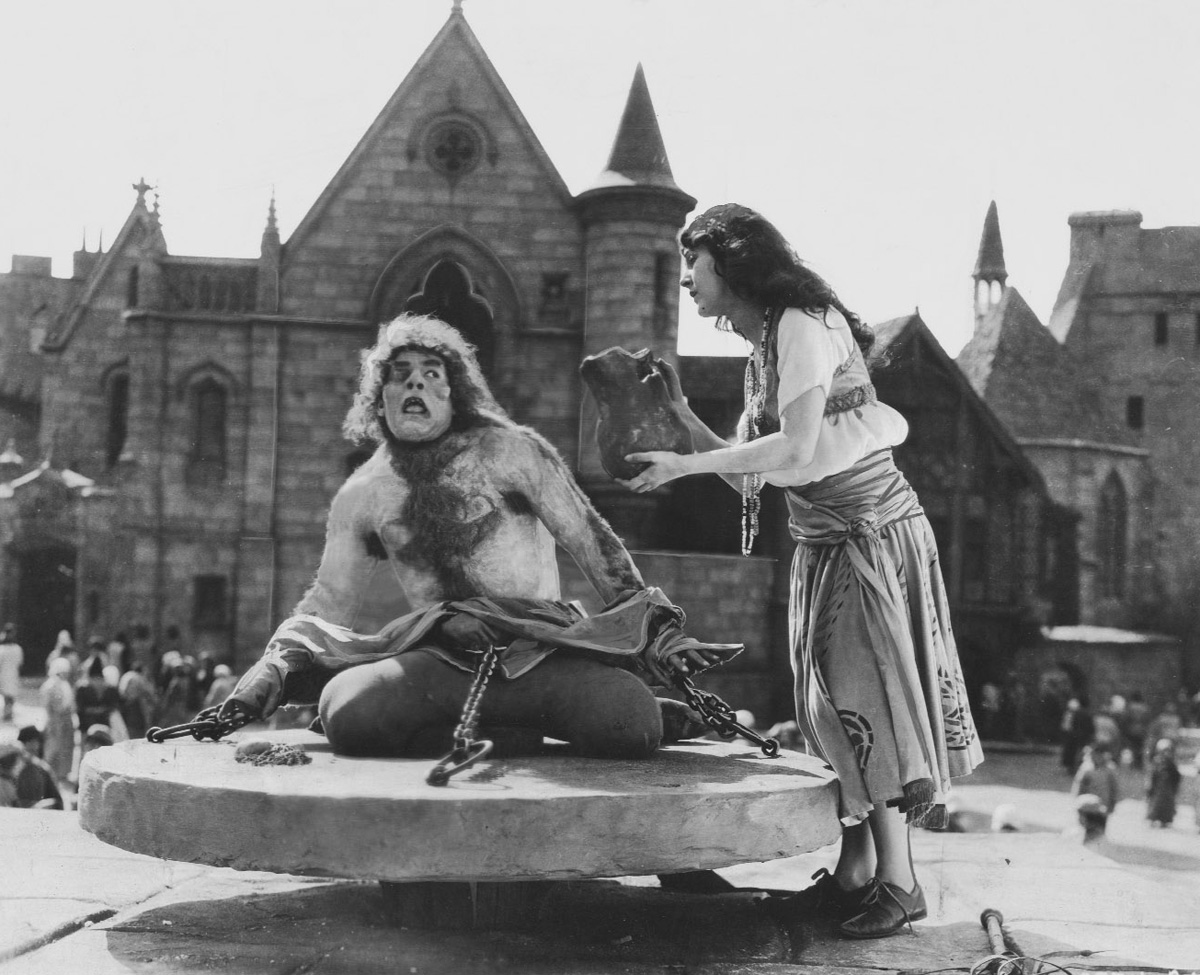
Chaney as Quasimodo, with Patsy Ruth Miller as co-star

- The film The Hunchback of Notre Dame, starring Lon Chaney, premiered at Carnegie Hall in New York City. The 102-minute silent movie, the most expensive (and highest-grossing) production of Universal Pictures up to that time, established Chaney as the premier horror film actor of the 1920s.
- A riot broke out in the small city of Perth Amboy, New Jersey when a mob of 6,000 attacked a hall where a meeting of 150 members of the Ku Klux Klan was being held. Police and firemen tried to control the crowd with clubs, gas bombs and water hoses, but were overwhelmed. Two cars full of Klansmen were intercepted before they could escape and the occupants were beaten.
- The annual Victory Day holiday, Zafer Bayrami, was celebrated in Turkey for the first time. The event, a public holiday since 1926, commemorated Turkey's victory in the decisive Battle of Dumlupınar to win the Greco-Turkish War on August 30, 1922.
- Born:
  - Philip D. McNamara, American Roman Catholic priest who directed the Catholic Relief Services charity in Cambodia during the Vietnam War; in Boston, United States (d. 1993)
  - Roger Pierre, French film and TV comedian; in Paris, France (d. 2010)
  - Maksim Passar, Soviet Army sniper, member of the Nanai Asian-Russian minority, who killed 237 enemy soldiers in World War II; in Nizhny Katar, Far Eastern Krai, Soviet Union (present-day Russia) (d. 1943, killed in action)
- Died:
  - Nancy Green, 89, African American storyteller, cook, activist and model for "Aunt Jemima"; killed in a pedestrian accident in Chicago (b. 1834)
  - Verner Moore White, 59, American portrait painter; died of a heart attack (b. 1863)
  - Lord Farquhar, 79, British noble and Lord Steward of the Household from 1915 to 1922 (b. 1844)

== August 31, 1923 (Friday) ==
- The Corfu incident began as Italian naval forces shelled and occupied the unfortified Greek island of Corfu with 11,000 troops.
- Harry Greb beat Johnny Wilson by 15-round decision at the Polo Grounds in New York City to become the new middleweight boxing champion of the world.
- The United States formally recognized Mexico.
- Another anti-KKK riot broke out, this time near New Castle, Delaware when a mob attacked a Klan initiation ceremony. Five were shot in the fighting.
- Born: Larry Grayson, English comedian and television presenter; as William Sulley White, in Banbury, Oxfordshire, England (d. 1995)
