= July 1923 =

Month of 1923

<<	July 1923					>>
Su	Mo	Tu	We	Th	Fr	Sa
1	2	3	4	5	6	7
8	9	10	11	12	13	14
15	16	17	18	19	20	21
22	23	24	25	26	27	28
29	30	31

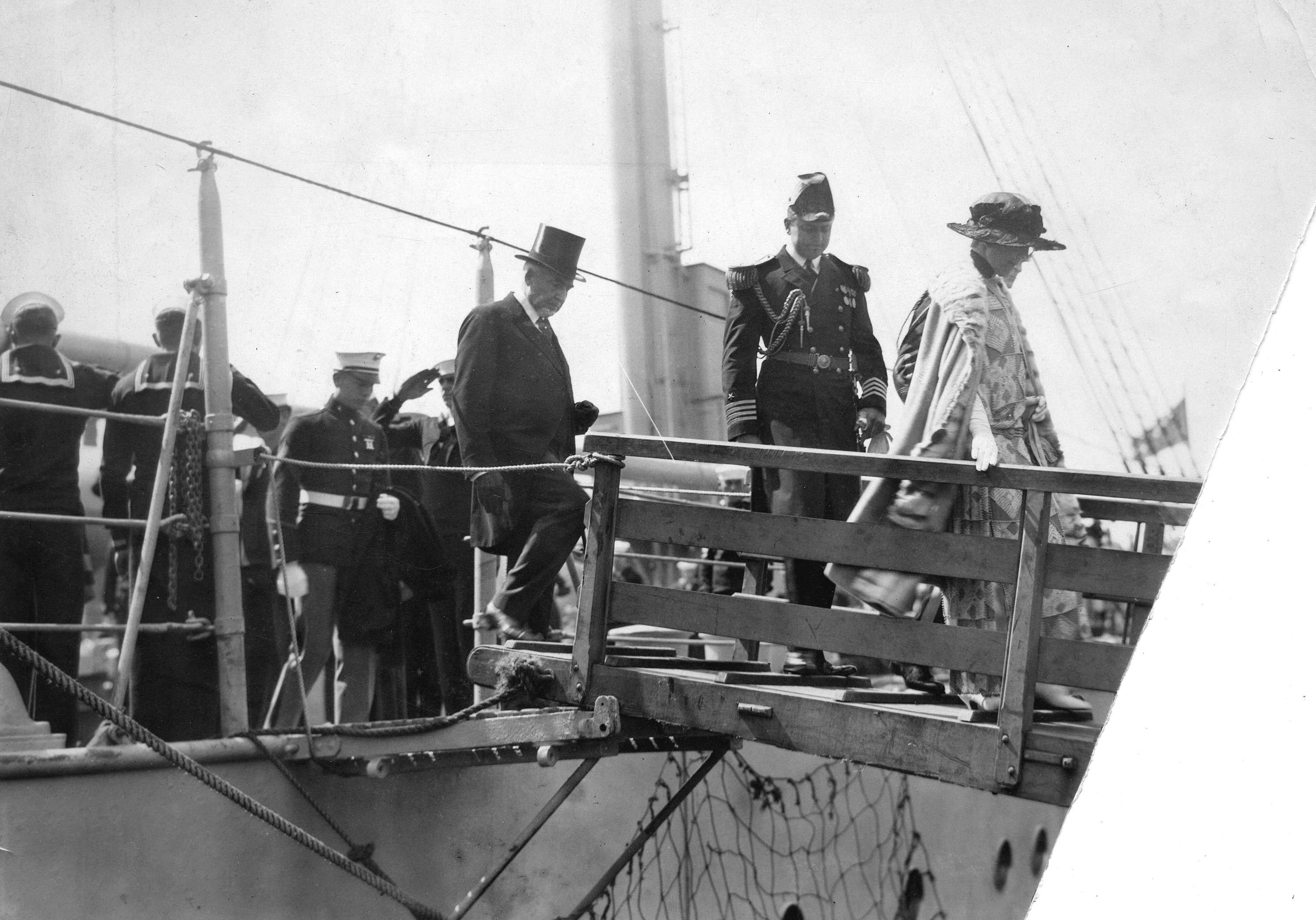
July 26, 1923: Ill from food poisoning, Warren G. Harding (in top hat) becomes first U.S. President to visit Canada

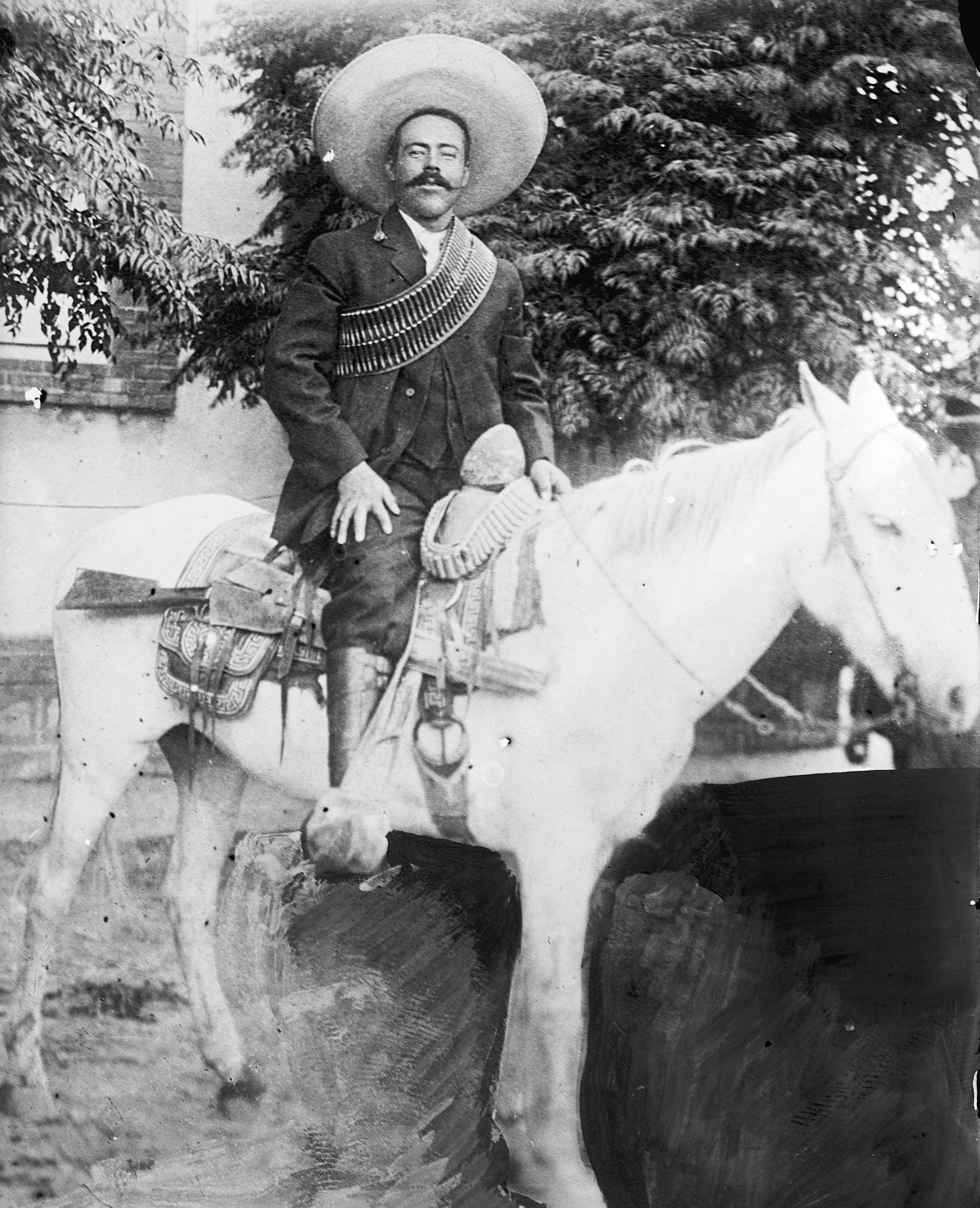
July 20, 1923: Mexican bandit Pancho Villa shot to death in Mexico

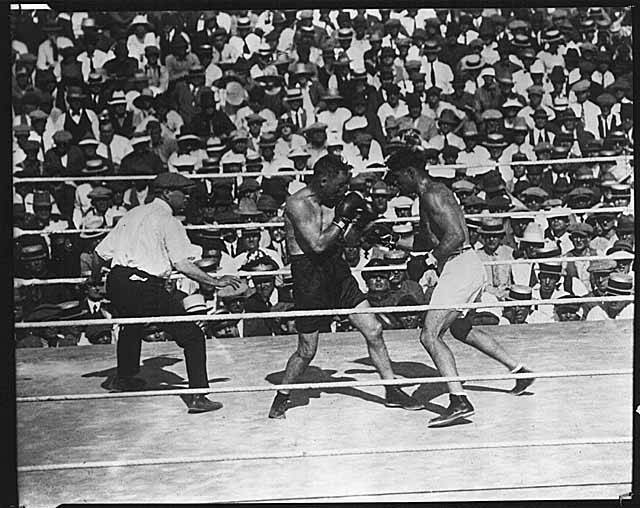
July 4, 1923: Remote town of Shelby, Montana, bankrupted by staging heavyweight boxing bout

The following events occurred in July 1923:

== July 1, 1923 (Sunday) ==
- The Chinese Immigration Act went into effect in Canada to bar Chinese immigrants (including those from Hong Kong) from coming to the Dominion of Canada, with only a few exceptions for foreign students and diplomats (whose stay was to be temporary), wealthy merchants and those who qualified for admission under "special circumstance". The Act would remain the law in Canada for more than 24 years until its repeal on May 14, 1947.
- The Belgian airline Sabena, founded on May 23, inaugurated commercial service with a flight from Brussels to London with a stopover in Ostend.
- France passed a naval budget providing for the construction of four new submarines.
- Born:
  - Brijmohan Lall Munjal, Indian entrepreneur and founder of the Hero Motors Company; in Kamalia, Punjab Province, British India (present-day Punjab province, Pakistan) (d. 2015)
  - Constance Ford, American actress, known for her role in Another World; as Cornelia Marie Ford, in the Bronx, New York City, United States (d. 1993)

== July 2, 1923 (Monday) ==
- Pope Pius XI sent a letter to the papal nuncio in Berlin appealing to Germany to make every effort to make its payment obligations and cease its resistance campaign which removed the possibility of coming to an agreement.
- A railway accident in Romania killed 63 people at the station in Vinty-Leanca, between Ploiești and Buzău when a mail train was diverted onto a platform where a passenger train had stopped.
- The Allied delegates at the Conference of Lausanne made their final offer to Turkey to settle the matter of reparations.
- Exactly one month before his death, U.S. President Warren G. Harding "realized a boyhood ambition" by being allowed to drive a railway locomotive. Harding "took a lesson from the engineer in regard to the functions of the various buttons which are used in turning power off and on, giving signals and otherwise operating the engine" and drove the 10-car presidential train on a steep downgrade through the Bitterroot Mountains in Montana. After arriving in Spokane, Washington later in the day, Harding spoke out against "ultra-conservationists". Noting that "another century will give us a population of 300,000,000", Harding said, "There was a time when the public domain was thought of as a treasure house of potential wealth to be locked up against the day when we should need it... As a matter of fact, that would prevent it from being ready when needed." In the same speech, however, he said that he would urge Congress upon his return to Washington to add 400,000 acres (160,000 ha) to Yellowstone National Park after having visited for two days.
- What would become the first "perfect copy" of the printed Gutenberg Bible in the United States was purchased at an auction in London by an agent for the Rosenbach Company of New York and Philadelphia, a dealer in rare books, for the amount of £9,000, $43,350 in the dollar to pound exchange rate at the time and equivalent to $750,000 a century later.
- An unauthorized dockworkers' strike began in England protesting the reduction of wages by a shilling a day.
- Henry Segrave of the United Kingdom won the French Grand Prix.
- Born: Wisława Szymborska, Polish writer, 1996 Nobel Prize in Literature laureate; as Maria Wisława Anna Szymborska, in Prowent, Poland (d. 2012)

== July 3, 1923 (Tuesday) ==
- President Harding visited the small town of Meacham, Oregon to speak at a celebration commemorating the 80th anniversary of the 1843 founding of the Oregon Trail. While it does not appear to have been part of his prepared speech a reporter wrote that Meacham was "the capital of the United States all day long," although even if the remark had been made, Harding, the reporters and most of his audience would have been aware that the U.S. president has no authority to move the national seat of government from Washington. Nevertheless, a historic marker at Meacham includes the statement that "On July 3, 1923, reporters noted that on July 3, 1923, Meacham was the capitol [sic] of the U.S. when President Harding stopped and participated in the exercises commemorating the eightieth anniversary of the covered wagon migration of 1843."
- Four German civilians were shot by Belgian soldiers after violating a curfew that had been imposed in the Ruhr occupation zone. The curfew, and the "shoot on sight" order had been put into effect immediately after eight Belgian soldiers had been killed in the June 30 bombing of the Duisburg-Hochfeld Railway Bridge, and took place in Buer, 25 miles (40 km) from Gelsenkirchen.
- Born: Bankole Timothy, Sierra Leonean journalist and author; as Emmanuel Bankole Timothy, in Freetown, Sierra Leone (d. 1994)

== July 4, 1923 (Wednesday) ==
- Champion Jack Dempsey and challenger Tommy Gibbons fought in a boxing bout staged in the small town of Shelby, Montana, in front of a crowd of less than 20,000 people, most of whom did not buy a ticket. Dempsey defeated Gibbons by decision to retain the World Heavyweight Championship, but the bout is mostly remembered as a debacle for the promoters who lost a fortune staging it in the remote oil town hoping to attract investors. The $116,000 lost by promoters would be equivalent to more than two million dollars a century later. Figures the next day showed that only 7,202 people paid to see the bout, but that the rentals of motion pictures would drop the deficit to $70,000.
- A massive Ku Klux Klan rally, the largest in the organization's history, was held in Kokomo, Indiana. Attendance estimates ran as high as 200,000.
- Stunt pilot B. H. DeLay was killed at the age of 31, along with a passenger, business owner R. I. Short, while performing in an airshow at Ocean Park in Venice, California. The wings of his airplane, the Wasp, collapsed as he was flying a loop-the-loop and the craft plunged downward. A subsequent investigation of the wreckage showed that the nuts and bolts for the wings had been tampered with in an act of sabotage although no person was ever charged with a crime.
- Born: Bernard Loomis, American toy developer and marketing coordinator who built up the Mattel, Kenner and Hasbro companies and conceived the idea of cartoon shows based on toys; in the Bronx, New York City, United States (d. 2006)

== July 5, 1923 (Thursday) ==
- Martial law was ended in the Kingdom of Egypt for the first time in almost nine years, with the release of 250 political prisoners who had been sentenced by British military courts during and after the outbreak of World War One.
- Ethel Barrymore was granted a divorce from Russell G. Colt in Providence, Rhode Island court on grounds of nonsupport. Neither principal was present, but testimony taken by deposition for the court was entered in which Barrymore said that Colt had struck her on numerous occasions.
- U.S. President Warren G. Harding and his entourage left Tacoma, Washington on the U.S. Navy transport USS Henderson headed for Alaska.

== July 6, 1923 (Friday) ==
- The Council of People's Commissars of the Soviet Union, commonly abbreviated to Sovnarkom (Soviet Narodnikh Komissarov Sovietskogo Soyuz) was formed by the All-Union Central Executive Committee (CIK) as the equivalent of the cabinet of ministers in the newly created Soviet Union, with Communist Party General Secretary Vladimir Lenin as the first Chairman. Lenin had five deputy chairmen and 10 people's commissars to assist in governing.
- A railway accident killed 17 passengers and injured 28 in New Zealand near the town of Ongarue on the North Island. The express train had departed Auckland for Wellington the night before and derailed upon encountering debris from a landslide.
- Suzanne Lenglen of France defeated Kitty McKane of Britain to win the women's championship at Wimbledon.
- Born:
  - Wojciech Jaruzelski, Polish military general and politician who served as First Secretary of the Polish United Workers' Party from 1981 to 1989, holding the government offices of Prime Minister of Poland 1981 to 1985, head of state as Chairman of the Polish Council of State from 1985 to 1989, and President of Poland 1989 to 1990; in Kurów, Poland (d. 2014)
  - Madame Claude, French brothel manager who catered to prominent government officials and businessmen; as Fernande Grudet, in Angers, France (d. 2015)

== July 7, 1923 (Saturday) ==
- A spokesman for the White House announced that President Harding's tour of the United States had been extended by two days. The telegram from Walter Brown said "Impossible to omit Santa Catalina trip without greatly disappointing Mrs. Harding. Have therefore arranged for President to sail from San Diego Aug. 6", after which the president's ship would travel down the coast of Mexico and Central America, passing through the Panama Canal and taking him back around the Gulf Coast and Atlantic Coast to return home.
- Bill Johnston defeated Frank Hunter to win the men's championship at Wimbledon. Both finalists at Britain's premier tennis tournament were American.
- American baseball pitcher Francis "Lefty" O'Doul, later enshrined in the Japanese Baseball Hall of Fame as an organizer, entered a game for the Boston Red Sox as a reliever and, in a single inning, gave up 13 runs to the host Cleveland Indians before being pulled back out. Cleveland went on to win the game, 27 to 3, having scored in every inning to set an American League record.
- The kingdoms of Romania and Yugoslavia signed a mutual defense treaty at Bucharest.
- The French Chamber of Deputies ratified the Washington Naval Treaty.

== July 8, 1923 (Sunday) ==
- President Warren G. Harding arrived at Metlakatla, Alaska on the ship USS Henderson, becoming the first president to visit the future U.S. state.
- In Czechoslovakia, woman deputy Betta Kerpiskova introduced a bill that would make bigamy mandatory, as it required all men to take two wives as a means of replenishing the population lost in the years of the war. Wives of the deputies shouted down the bill from the gallery, and one speaker said Czechoslovakia would face ridicule around the world if the law was passed. The session was adjourned after a shouting match.
- The bodies of Takeo Arishima and his wife were found in the Japanese novelist's villa. They both committed suicide by hanging but were not found for a month.
- Born: Harrison Dillard, American track and field athlete, Olympic gold medalist in the 1948 and 1952 Olympics; as William Harrison Dillard, in Cleveland, United States (d. 2019)
- Died: Augustine Tuillerie, 89, French children's book author (b. 1833)

== July 9, 1923 (Monday) ==
- At 1:20 in the morning, the parties to the Lausanne Conference reached an agreement on the amount of Turkey's World War One reparations. The treaty was signed formally on July 24.
- The Maharaja Ripudaman Singh, monarch of the princely state of Nabha, was forced by colonial authorities in British India to abdicate his throne in favor of his 3-year-old son, Pratap Singh Nabha, after having defied the Governor-General, Lord Reading. About 250 Gurkha and Dogra troops, led by Lt. Colonel Frederick F. Minchin, surrounded the Heera Mahal Palace in Nabha (now part of the Indian state of Punjab) and Ripudaman was given an ultimatum to leave.
- On an American Museum of Natural History expedition that was exploring the Djadochta Formation in Mongolia, a Chinese employee made the first discovery of the Saurornithoides mongoliensis, finding a fossilized specimen.
- U.S. Army Lieutenant Russell Maughan was unsuccessful in his initial attempt to make the first dawn-to-dusk transcontinental flight across the United States, from New York City to San Francisco, and landed his plane in a cow pasture in St. Joseph, Missouri with engine trouble. On his second attempt, on July 19, he was forced to land at Rock Springs, Wyoming because of a broken oil line.
- Born: Beryl Nashar, Australian geologist, the first female Dean at an Australian university; as Beryl Scott, in Maryville, New South Wales, Australia (d. 2012)
- Died: William R. Day, 74, American diplomat and jurist, served as an associate justice of U.S. Supreme Court from 1903 to 1922 (b. 1849)

== July 10, 1923 (Tuesday) ==
- The Paraguayan Civil War ended after more than 13 months as former President Manuel Gondra and his supporters marched into the capital at Asunción and routed the remaining supporters of Eduardo Schaerer.
- The Curia Julia, the 1,967-year-old Roman Senate building constructed in 44 B.C. during the reign of Julius Caesar, was purchased by the government of Italy from the Collegio di Spagna.
- An explosion at a cartridge plant near East Alton, Illinois, killed 11 people.
- Marguerite Alibert, a French socialite who had had an affair with the Prince of Wales during World War One, shot and killed her Egyptian husband of six months, Ali Kamel Fahmy Bey, during an argument at their suite in London's Savoy Hotel. She would be acquitted of murder charges on September 15, 1923.
- Born: John Bradley, U.S. Navy Hospital corpsman and flag raiser on Iwo Jima, in Antigo, Wisconsin, United States (d. 1994)
- Died:
  - Albert Chevalier, 62, English comedian and actor (b. 1861)
  - Luther W. Mott, 48, American politician, served as U.S. Representative for New York from 1911 until his death; died after an illness (b. 1874)

== July 11, 1923 (Wednesday) ==
- France notified Britain that it would not accept an international conference to discuss the German reparations problem. "The reparations commission was legally created by the Versailles treaty to handle the problem and this cannot be transferred elsewhere without violating the treaty", a spokesperson for the government said.
- Harry Frazee sold the Boston Red Sox to a group led by Bob Quinn for $1.25 million.
- Born: Dan Berry, American cartoonist (d. 1997)

== July 12, 1923 (Thursday) ==
- British Prime Minister Stanley Baldwin made a speech before the House of Commons about the issue of German reparations and the occupation of the Ruhr, stating that "if we ask Germany to pay in excess of her capacity we shall not succeed ... We are convinced that an indefinite continuation of this state of affairs is fraught with great peril. Germany herself appears to be moving fast towards economic chaos, which may itself be succeeded by social and industrial ruin." Baldwin proposed that an impartial body be allowed to investigate Germany's capacity to pay.
- Turkey and Poland signed a trade agreement.
- Before 100,000 paying customers, the largest crowd up to that time to watch a boxing bout, heavyweight Luis Ángel Firpo of Argentina knocked out former world champion Jess Willard at the Boyle's Thirty Acres arena in Jersey City, New Jersey.
- Born:
  - Sy Berger, American designer known for creating the modern baseball card in 1952; as Seymour Perry Berger, in New York City, United States (d. 2014)
  - James E. Gunn, American science fiction author; in Kansas City, Missouri, United States (d. 2020)
- Died:
  - Ernst Otto Beckmann, 70, German pharmacist and chemist known for his discovery of the Beckmann rearrangement of the structure of an oxime functional group to substituted amides, and for inventing the Beckmann thermometer (b. 1853)
  - William P. Dillingham, 79, American attorney and politician, served as the Governor of Vermont from 1888 to 1890 and as the U.S. Senator from Vermont from 1900 until his death (b. 1843)

== July 13, 1923 (Friday) ==
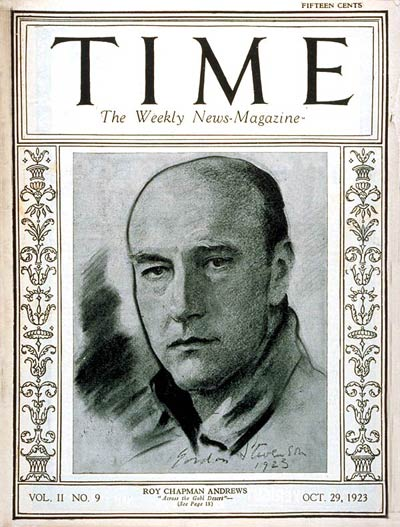
Andrews

- Near the Flaming Cliffs in Mongolia, a party of paleontologists led by U.S. explorer Roy Chapman Andrews became the first people to discover dinosaur eggs. The fossilized eggs would be determined 72 years later to belong to an oviraptorosaur.
- The Hollywood Sign was officially dedicated. It was originally erected earlier that year as a temporary structure to promote the real estate development ""Hollyoodland", and would prove a popular landmark in Hollywood, California, eventually dropping the last four letters in 1949.
- Hermann Ehrhardt escaped from a German prison in Leipzig, 10 days before his trial for high treason over the Kapp Putsch was set to begin.
- France refused to sign on to the British reply to Germany's offer on reparations unless its primary demand stated that passive resistance in the Ruhr be ended.
- Born:
  - Erich Lessing, Austrian photographer; in Vienna, Austria (d. 2018)
  - Norma Zimmer, American singer; as Norma Larsen, in Larson, Idaho, United States (d. 2011)
  - Ashley Bryan, American children's author; in New York City, United States (d. 2022)
  - Sudie Bond, American actress; as Sude Bond, in Elizabethtown, Kentucky, United States (d. 1984)

== July 14, 1923 (Saturday) ==
- The Hague Academy of International Law, a summer program funded by the Carnegie Endowment for International Peace, opened in the Netherlands.
- U.S. President Warren G. Harding visited Anchorage, Alaska.
- Born:
  - Willie Steele, American track athlete, 1948 Olympic gold medalist in the long jump; as William Steele, in El Centro, California, United States (d. 1989)
  - Enrique Echeverría, pioneering Mexican abstract painter; in Mexico City, Mexico (d. 1972)
- Died:
  - Eugène Chigot, 62, pioneering French post-impressionist painter (b. 1860)
  - George C. Hale, 72, American fire chief and novelty inventor who created Hale's Tours and Scenes of the World, a 10-minute simulated train ride to exotic destinations using film, sound effects, a wind machine and a rocking platform (b. 1849)

== July 15, 1923 (Sunday) ==
- The Soviet Union's first national airline, Dobrolet, began operations by making a flight from Moscow to Nizhny Novgorod to inaugurate regularly scheduled commercial passenger service in the U.S.S.R.; the state-owned company's name would be changed to Aeroflot in 1932.
- The government of Egypt banned its Muslim citizens from making the Hajj, the pilgrimage to Mecca, as well as its annual subsidy to the Kingdom of Hejaz, after King Hussein bin Ali, King of Hejaz barred the Egyptian medical escort caravan from accompanying the Egyptian pilgrims into the kingdom. The custom of sending a medical mission as part of the Hajj was "a precaution rendered necessary by the total lank of sanitary protection in the Hedjaz", and Hussein's decree was made on grounds that the escort was an infringement on Hejazi independence.
- U.S. President Warren G. Harding symbolically completed construction of the Alaska Railroad by using a hammer to drive the golden spike linking the rails that had been built from different directions, in a ceremony near the town of Nenana.
- The Italian parliament passed Benito Mussolini's electoral reform law by a vote of 303 to 140 which permitted gerrymandering favorable to the incumbent Fascist Party.
- Bobby Jones, a 21-year-old amateur from the U.S. state of Georgia, won his first career major golf championship at the U.S. Open, defeating Bobby Cruickshank of Scotland.
- French Prime Minister Raymond Poincaré made a speech to the senate rejecting almost every item of Stanley Baldwin's speech, saying that "we wish only that the treaty signed by twenty-eight powers shall not be considered an antediluvian fossil and placed in an archaeological museum after four years. It seems that we ask too much. Certain friends say to make concessions for a common interest. Since the end of the armistice we have done nothing but make concessions. We are at the end of making concessions because until now we stood all the costs ... Instead of helping us obtain payment Germany has organized resistance, forcing us to accentuate the pressure. We thus are not responsible for the resulting situation."
- Born: Herb Sargent, American television producer and comedy writer known for the co-creation of the popular Weekend Update feature on Saturday Night Live; as Herbert Supowitz, in Philadelphia, United States (d. 2005)
- Died:
  - Semyon Alapin, 66, Russian chess master and the namesake for nine different opening moves in chess (b. 1856)
  - Wilhelm Jerusalem, 68, Austrian Jewish philosopher; died of a heart attack (b. 1854)

== July 16, 1923 (Monday) ==
- Italy and Britain agreed to call an international conference on the German reparations issue, with or without the participation of France.
- Magnus Johnson of the leftist Minnesota Farmer–Labor Party was elected to the U.S. Senate in a special election to fill the unexpired term of the late Senator Knute Nelson, making Minnesota the only U.S. state at the time to have both U.S. senators as Farmer-Labor Party members.
- Gambling was banned in Italy.
- Born: K. V. Krishna Rao, Chief of Staff of the Indian Army, and Governor of Tripura, Nagaland, Manipur, and Jammu and Kashmir; as Kotikalapudi Venkata Krishna Rao, in Vizianagaram, Madras Province, British India (present-day India) (d. 2016)
- Died: Charles Boardman Hawes, 34, American novelist; died of pneumonic meningitis two days before the publication of his new book, Gloucester, by Land and Sea, and three months before the release of his children's adventure, The Dark Frigate (b. 1889)

== July 17, 1923 (Tuesday) ==
- Nearly all of the Philippine-born officials of the territorial government of the U.S.-controlled Philippines resigned in protest over the actions of U.S. Governor-General Leonard Wood. The entire Council of State and the Filipino members of Wood's cabinet walked out after Wood had reinstated an American official who had been charged with bribery. Manuel Quezon, who quit as president of the Philippine Senate, sent a cable message to U.S. president Harding, saying "We welcome the present crisis because it will call the attention of Congress to the need of a definite status of government here. In the resignations of members of the Council of State and departmental secretaries, there is no attack on the sovereign power of the United States, nor a challenge to the authority of its representative in the Philippine Islands... but it is a protest against the encroachment of the Governor-General on the constitutional rights already enjoyed by the Filipino people, against usurpation of power in direct violation of existing laws."
- A libel trial opened in England between Lord Alfred Douglas and The Morning Post of London. Douglas was suing the newspaper for printing a letter from a Jewish correspondent saying that it must no longer be a paying proposition for men like Douglas "to invent vile insults against the Jews." This remark was a reference to Douglas' newspaper, Plain English, which regularly printed antisemitic articles alleging Jewish conspiracies.
- Born:
  - Abida Ahmed, Indian politician, artist, and social activist; served as the First Lady of India from 1974 to 1977 as the wife of President Fakhruddin Ali Ahmed; in Badaun, United Provinces of British India, British India (present-day Uttar Pradesh, India) (d. 2003)
  - Enrique Angelelli, Argentine Catholic priest and martyr; in Córdoba, Argentina (d. 1976; assassinated)

== July 18, 1923 (Wednesday) ==
- Winston Churchill took the stand in the Lord Alfred Douglas libel trial and said that the plaintiff told an absolute lie when he alleged that Ernest Cassel had paid Churchill to print a false account of the Battle of Jutland attributing victory to Germany so stocks would fall and a group of Jews could turn a profit when they went up again. A deposition from Arthur Balfour was read in which he said that he alone had written the Jutland report and that Churchill had nothing to do with it. The jury returned a verdict awarding Douglas one farthing in damages.
- Italy published a "timetable" for the Italianization of South Tyrol. Italian was to be made the official language of the mostly German-speaking region, and Austro-German immigration into the region would be banned.
- Born:
  - Jerome H. Lemelson, American engineer and inventor; in Staten Island, New York, United States (d. 1997)
  - Erik Nygren, Swedish Air Force officer; in Visby, Sweden (d. 1999)

== July 19, 1923 (Thursday) ==
- Russell Maughan's second attempt at the first dawn-to-dusk transcontinental flight across the United States ended 738 miles short of his goal of San Francisco when an oil leak forced him to land in Rock Springs, Wyoming. Maughan, who was flying averaging 192 miles per hour (309 km/h) was only 598 miles (962 km) short of his destination when he was forced to end his effort. Maughan decided, with the increasingly shorter daylight hours as the summer progressed, he would not try again until the following year.
- The government of Colombia created its own office to oversee government spending, the Contraloría General de la República de Colombia.
- Born: Joseph Hansen, American mystery writer who created the "Dave Brandstetter" series of mysteries; in Aberdeen, South Dakota, United States (d. 2004)

== July 20, 1923 (Friday) ==
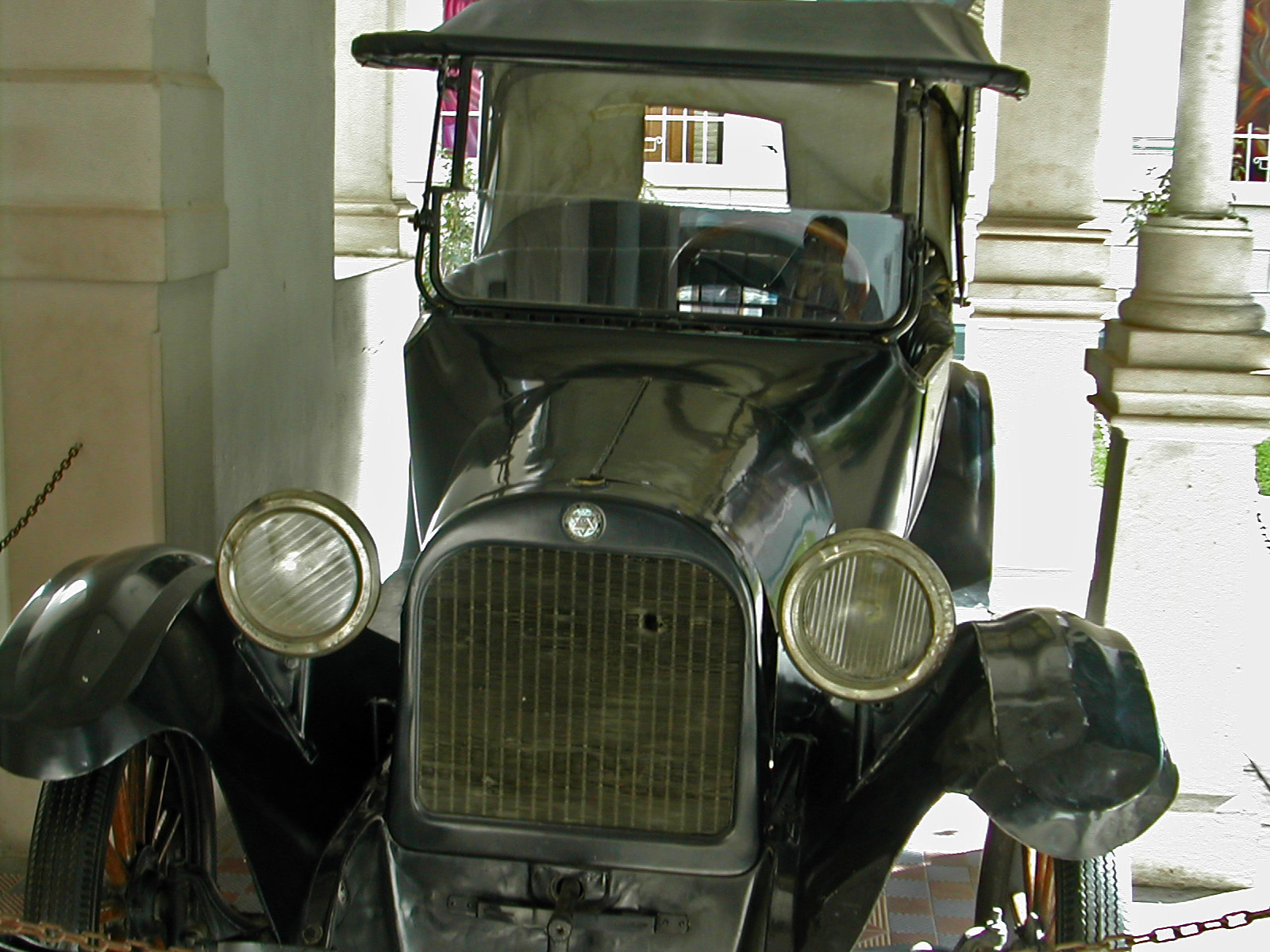
Villa's bullet-riddled 1915 Dodge

- General Pancho Villa, the retired guerrilla leader who had led the Mexican Revolution that forced out President Porfirio Díaz and brought Francisco I. Madero to power in 1911, was shot dead along with his assistant Daniel Tamayo, his chauffeur Miguel Trujillo, and two bodyguards, Rafael Madreno and Claro Huertado. Villa and his entourage had traveled from his ranch in Canutillo to the nearby town of Hidalgo del Parral to pick up cash to pay his employees. As he was being driven through town on his way back home, Villa was shot by a group of seven men who fired more than 40 rounds into his automobile. Villa, who had caused the deaths of countless numbers of people, was hit by nine bullets and killed instantly, along with all but one of his bodyguards. Only Ramon Contreras, who was wounded but killed one of the gunmen, survived. Reports from Mexico suggested that the assassination had been commissioned by Francisco Herrera, whose father and three brothers had been executed by Villa during the Revolution, and the death "was accepted as life answering for life."
- A survey by the Carnegie Institute concluded that Germany was unable to pay any further reparations at this time because all the country's movable capital had been exhausted.
- Born:
  - Stanisław Albinowski, Polish economist and journalist; in Lwów, Poland (present-day Lviv, Ukraine) (d. 2005)
  - Elisabeth Becker, German war criminal and Stutthof concentration camp overseer who selected which women and children would be killed; in Neuteich, Free City of Danzig (present-day Nowy Staw, Poland) (d. 1946; executed by hanging)

== July 21, 1923 (Saturday) ==
- The first regular radio broadcast in the Netherlands was carried out by the Hilversum Wireless Broadcasting's station.
- Wearing the cowls on their robes, about 1,000 members of the Ku Klux Klan paraded on the main street of Topeka, Kansas, in defiance of an order issued to Topeka authorities by Kansas Attorney General Charles B. Griffith to prevent the marchers from wearing masks. Topeka's Mayor Earl Akers declined to abide by the order, declaring that there was no law against parading while wearing a mask.
- Born: Rudolph A. Marcus, Canadian-born American chemist and winner of the 1992 Nobel Prize in Chemistry for his postulation of the Marcus theory of outer-sphere electron transfer in chemical reactions; in Montreal, Canada (d. 2026)

== July 22, 1923 (Sunday) ==
- All but one of the 32-member crew of the American oil tanker SS Swiftstar disappeared after the ship exploded and sank near the Colombian island of San Andrés while en route from the U.S. city of San Pedro, California to Fall River, Massachusetts, after passing through the Panama Canal. In addition to the wreckage of the ship, the schooner Albert H. Willis found the remains of the lifeboats from the Swiftstar and a floating box that had the charred body of one of the crew. A review by investigators concluded that a bolt of lightning hit the tanker based on the pattern of the burns to the lone remains recovered.
- Henri Pélissier won the Tour de France.
- During a game against the Cleveland Indians, Walter Johnson of the Washington Senators became the first Major League Baseball pitcher in history to record 3,000 career strikeouts. He would finish with 3,508 strikeouts, a record that would stand until 1978.
- A 6.3 magnitude earthquake struck near San Bernardino, California at 11:28 p.m. The County Hospital and Hall of Records were badly damaged but there were no fatalities.
- The Navy transport U.S.S. Henderson departed from Sitka, Alaska with U.S. President Harding en route to Canada and his return to the continental United States.
- Born:
  - Bob Dole, American attorney and politician, served as the U.S. Representative from Kansas (1961-1969) and as U.S. Senator from Kansas (1969-1996), was the Republican Leader of the U.S. Senate for 11 years, and ran as the Republican nominee in the 1996 presidential election; as Robert Dole, in Russell, Kansas, United States (d. 2021)
  - The Fabulous Moolah, American professional wrestler and 8-time winner of the NWA World Women's Championship; as Mary Lillian Ellison, in Kershaw County, South Carolina, United States (d. 2007)
  - Mukesh, popular Indian singer; as Mukesh Chand Mathur, in Delhi, British India (present-day India) (d. 1976)

== July 23, 1923 (Monday) ==
- Two trains collided in Bulgaria near the city of Pleven, and the number of dead was unclear from reports. A dispatch the next day reported 103 killed and 200 injured. A followup report declared that 200 people died and 300 were injured in the accident "in which an engine and 11 coaches were derailed and flattened by the contact" and added "From 10 coaches, no one escaped alive." The next dispatch from Havas, the Bulgarian news agency, reported that the toll was 8 persons killed and about 20 injured and that "The correspondent's dispatch does not bear out published reports that the death list would mount into hundreds."
- The chiefs of 16 Squamish villages in the Canadian provinces of the British Columbia signed an agreement to form the Squamish Nation (Sḵwx̱wú7mesh Úxwumixw), which now administers 24 Indian Reserves as one of the First Nations governments.
- In the Rif War in Morocco between France and the indigenous Arabs, the 6th Battalion of the 1st regiment of the French Foreign Legion attempted an attack on Tagzhout Hill and lost 18 men killed and 36 wounded.
- An attempt by Labour to get the House of Commons to call for an international disarmament conference was spurned by Stanley Baldwin and the Conservatives, who believed that the time was not right.
- Norman Clyde became the first person to ascend an 8,610 feet (2,620 m) mountain summit in Glacier National Park in the U.S. state of Montana, one of 11 first ascents that he made in 36 days of climbing 36 different mountains, and out of 130 first ascents that he made in his lifetime. Park officials named the summit Clyde Peak in his honor.
- Born: Morris Halle, Latvian-born American linguist and pioneer in the study of phonology; as Moriss Pinkovics, in Liepāja, Latvia (d. 2018)
- Died: Charles Dupuy, 71, French statesman, three-time Prime Minister of France (1893, 1894–1895 and 1898–1899) (b. 1851)

== July 24, 1923 (Tuesday) ==
- The Treaty of Lausanne was signed in Switzerland at the Beau-Rivage Palace, as the final peace treaty of World War I, formally ending hostilities between the Allies and the Ottoman Empire. Among the provisions was the agreement by Turkey to abolish the Ottoman Empire and completion of transition to the Republic of Turkey; acknowledgment of the right of the merchant ships of Allied nations to pass through the Turkish Straits (the Dardanelles and Bosphorous); the safe transition of the Greek population of Turkey to Greece; recognition of the British control of the island of Cyprus; and cession of the Danube River island of Ada Kaleh (now submerged) to Romania. In return, the Britain, France, Italy and Greece Allies agreed to remove their occupational forces from Constantinople (now Istanbul), and agreed that the debts of the Ottoman Empire would be borne by all the nations created from the empire's breakup, and not solely by Turkey. Occupational troops were removed by October 4, before the entry of the treaty into force on August 6, 1924.
- The Hague Academy of International Law was inaugurated.
- Born:
  - George Mallet, Saint Lucian politician, served as the Governor-General of Saint Lucia from 1996 to 1997; in Panama City, Panama (d. 2010)
  - T.R. Narasimharaju, Indian comedian and film actor; in Tiptur, Mysore State, British India (present-day Karnataka state, India) (d. 1979)
  - Cardinal Albert Vanhoye, French Roman Catholic priest who was the oldest member of the College of Cardinals at the time of his death at 98 years old; in Hazebrouck, département du Nord, France (d. 2021)

== July 25, 1923 (Wednesday) ==
- Film star Lila Lee was married on her 18th birthday to actor James Kirkwood, twenty-six years her senior, in Hollywood.
- Born:
  - Estelle Getty, American actress, known for role as Sophia Petrillo on The Golden Girls; as Estelle Scher, in New York City, United States (d. 2008)
  - Li Yuru, Chinese opera singer and actress; as Li Shuzhen, in Beijing, Republic of China (present-day China) (d. 2008)
  - David Lam, Hong Kong-born Canadian banker and philanthropist who served as the Lieutenant Governor of British Columbia from 1988 to 1995; in British Hong Kong (present-day Hong Kong) (d. 2010)
  - Cherry Marshall, English fashion model; as Irene Pearson, in Christchurch, Dorset, England (d. 2006)
  - Maria Gripe, Swedish fantasy fiction author; as Maja Walte, in Vaxholm, Sweden (d. 2007)
  - Leonardo Villar, Brazilian film actor known for O Pagador de Promessas; as Leonildo Motta, in Piracicaba, São Paulo state, Brazil (d. 2020)
  - Bill Fitsell, Canadian sports historian for the International Hockey Hall of Fame; as John Walter Fitsell, in Barrie, Ontario, Canada (d. 2020)

== July 26, 1923 (Thursday) ==
- At 11:00 in the morning, Warren G. Harding became the first U.S. President to visit Canada, disembarking from the U.S.S. Henderson at Vancouver on his way back from Alaska. After a luncheon and a round of golf at the Shaughnessy Heights Golf Club, President Harding addressed a crowd of 50,000 people at Stanley Park as the guest of British Columbia Premier John Oliver. At 7:00 in the evening, the Canadian government hosted a formal dinner in honor of the President and Mrs. Harding at the Hotel Vancouver, after which the presidential party returned to the Henderson. While the ship was traveling through Puget Sound on the way from Vancouver to Seattle, President Harding dined on crab and became ill in the evening. According to The New York Times summary of the physician report three days later, "The President's indisposition is attributed primarily to eating crabs on the transport Henderson.... That night President Harding had severe pains in the abdomen and had a generally disagreeable time."
- Johnny Dundee beat Eugène Criqui by 15-round decision to win the World Featherweight Boxing Title at the Polo Grounds in New York City.
- Donald Macadie of England was granted British patent 200,977 for his invention of the volt-ohm-milliammeter (or "multimeter") which could measure electrical voltage, resistance and current.
- The Yugoslavian royal family announced the engagement of Prince Paul of Yugoslavia and Princess Olga of Greece and Denmark.
- Born:
  - Bernice Rubens, Welsh novelist and the first woman to win the Booker Prize for The Elected Member; as Bernice Ruth Reuben, in Splott, Cardiff, Wales (d. 2004)
  - Betty Gilderdale, English-born New Zealand children's book author known for the "Little Yellow Digger" series; as Betty Harrington, in London, England (d. 2021)
  - Joseph Chamberlain, astronomer and educator who had directed Chicago's Adler Planetarium and New York City's Hayden Planetarium; in Peoria, Illinois, United States (d. 2011)

== July 27, 1923 (Friday) ==
- The first opera performance in what is now Israel took place at the Eden Cinema in Tel Aviv, where former Russian conductor Mordechai Golinkin had organized the Eretz-Israeli Opera Company. Golinkin conducted an orchestra for the performance of Giuseppe Verdi's La Traviata.
- President Harding arrived in Seattle, where he delivered what would be his last major speech. He spoke at the University of Washington's Husky Stadium, addressing the audience about the future of the Alaska Territory, where he had stayed a few days earlier. "Alaska is designed for ultimate Statehood," Harding said, although he was only referring to a portion of it. Harding told the audience, "In a very few years we can well set off the Panhandle and a large block of the connecting southeastern part as a State. This region now contains easily 90 percent of the white population and of the developed resources. As to the remainder of the territory, I would leave the Alaskans of the future to decide."
- The Republican Party announced that President Harding's scheduled July 31 speech from the San Francisco Civic Auditorium would be heard on a nationwide radio broadcast by as many as five million people, with the aid of telephone lines linking stations KPO in San Francisco, WOAW in Omaha, Nebraska; WMAQ in Chicago; WEAF in New York City; WMAF near Boston; and WCAP in Washington.
- Born:
  - Ray Boone, American professional baseball player and 1955 RBI leader in the American League; as Raymond Boone, in San Diego, California, United States (d. 2004)
  - Gerard Nierenberg, American lawyer and expert on negotiation strategy; in Queens, New York City, United States (d. 2012)
- Died:
  - Rosa Kerschbaumer-Putjata, 72, Russian ophthalmologist (b. 1851)
  - Mike Quinn, 49, Canadian professional ice hockey executive who coached the National Hockey Association's Quebec Bulldogs to two consecutive Stanley Cup titles (b. 1874)

== July 28, 1923 (Saturday) ==
- President Harding canceled his planned visits to Oregon and Yosemite National Park due to an illness reported to be ptomaine poisoning. On doctor's orders, Harding remained in bed on his special train and canceled a speaking engagement planned at stops in Eugene, Oregon and at El Portal, California outside Yosemite National Park. U.S. Secretary of the Interior Hubert Work told a disappointed crowd at a stop in Grants Pass, Oregon, "It comes about that during our last day at sea many of us were attacked by a temporary indisposition, not due to seasickness but to food put up in a can. I will not say what the item of food was, for thereby I might depress the value of the canned product." His train continued on to San Francisco.
- An explosion killed 28 coal miners in England at the Maltby Colliery in Maltby, South Yorkshire.
- In Australia, New South Wales Premier Sir George Fuller ceremonially turned the first sod in the construction of the Sydney Harbour Bridge.
- Born:
  - Xia Peisu, Chinese computer scientist, developed China's first general purpose electronic computer; in Chongqing, Sichuan province, Republic of China (present-day China) (d. 2014)
  - H. S. S. Lawrence, Indian educator who planned and implemented the 10+2+3 of school district organization in 1978; as Harris Sam Sahayam Lawrence, in Nagercoil, Travancore kingdom, British India (present-day Tamil Nadu state, India) (d. 2009)

== July 29, 1923 (Sunday) ==
- German communists staged a "Red Sunday" with public demonstrations across the country, but turnouts in most cities were low. Four were killed in Neuruppin when communists rushed the city jail and police fired on the unruly mob.
- President Harding's personal physician, Dr. Charles E. Sawyer, issued a nighttime bulletin saying the president's condition had worsened with new symptoms, and that his itinerary for the rest of speaking tour in California was canceled.
- Italy's Prime Minister Benito Mussolini received "telegrams, letters and missives of all kinds from all classes of people" on the occasion of his 40th birthday, with greetings from more than 30,000 arriving at his office in the Foreign Ministry Building, and at his private residence.
- Outside of Yazoo City, Mississippi, a mob captured Willie Minnifield, an African American accused of attacking a white woman with an axe, and burned him at the stake at a swamp where he had been captured. A man captured along with Minnifield escaped.
- Born:
  - Jim Marshall, English businessman and founder of Marshall Amplification; in Acton, London, England (d. 2012)
  - George Burditt, Emmy Award-nominated American television writer and producer; in Boston, United States (d. 2013)

== July 30, 1923 (Monday) ==
- The British Empire formally made claim a 5/36ths section of the continent of Antarctica, with a declaration that the Ross Dependency would comprise " all the islands and territories between the 160th degree of East Longitude and the 150th degree of West Longitude which are situated south of the 60th degree of South Latitude", in an Order in Council was issued by the British government. The Governor-General of New Zealand was appointed the Governor of the Territory. The move followed a memorandum from Leo Amery, the British First Lord of the Admiralty, that "with the exception of Chile and Argentina and some barren islands belonging to France, it is desirable that the whole of Antarctica the Antarctic should ultimately be included in the British Empire."
- The physicians attending President Harding issued another nighttime bulletin reporting bronchopneumonia in the right lung and describing his condition as "grave".
- U.S. Vice President Calvin Coolidge received bulletins of President Harding's condition while on vacation in Plymouth, Vermont. Coolidge and his wife were visiting his father's home, and the vice president told reporters that he had been given news by long distance telephone and "expressed the view that there was not the occasion for alarm over the President's condition that he felt earlier in the day might exist."

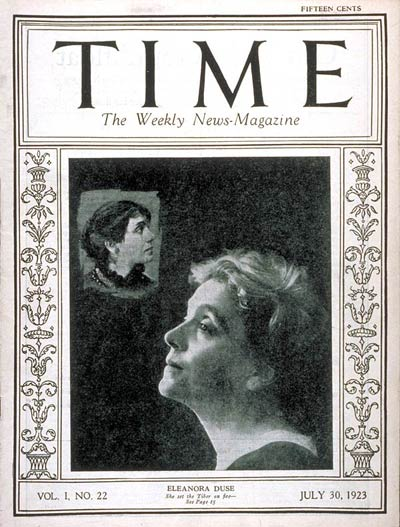
Eleanora Duse

- Italian actress Eleonora Duse became the first woman to be featured on the cover of Time magazine, after 21 consecutive covers with men. A woman would not appear again on the cover until the April 21, 1924 issue, with Lou Henry Hoover.
- Sidney Bechet made his recording debut, cutting "Wild Cat Blues" and "Kansas City Man Blues" as part of a quintet known as Clarence Williams' Blue Five.
- The execution of Roy Mitchell, an African-American convicted of six murders, was carried out by a public hanging in Waco, Texas, pursuant to a sentence by the county court.
- Born:
  - Michael Shepherd, Welsh psychiatrist; in Cardiff, Wales (d. 1995)
  - Hrant Shahinyan, Soviet Armenian gymnast and 1952 Olympic gold medalist; in Gyulagarak, Transcaucasian SSR, Soviet Union (present-day Armenia) (d. 1996)
- Died:
  - Charles Hawtrey, 64, English actor, director, producer and manager; died after a short illness (b. 1858)
  - Constance von Stumm, 34, American heiress and wife of German diplomat Baron Ferdinand Carl von Stumm; committed suicide (b. 1889)

== July 31, 1923 (Tuesday) ==
- A railway accident killed 47 people at the German city of Kreiensen, where a stopped train was hit by a locomotive on the Hamburg to Munich express. Initial reports said that 100 people were killed and 34 injured.
- The High Court of Justice in Ireland ruled that since the Irish Civil War had been settled with a treaty, a state of war no longer existed in the Irish Free State and that the imprisonment of 13,000 anti-treaty Republicans, legal only in wartime, was now illegal.
- Dr. Charles E. Sawyer, the Physician to the President, reported from the Palace Hotel in San Francisco that U.S. President Harding's condition had improved and that he was resting comfortably. An evening bulletin from the five members physician team said "The President has maintained the ground gained since last night. His temperature is 100; pulse 120; respiration 44 and regular. Nourishment is being taken regularly, and the laboratory findings indicate elimination is improving. In general he is more comfortable and resting better."
- The text of President Harding's national address by radio, which he had planned to give on the evening of July 31, was made public by his press secretary, George B. Christian. In a statement, Christian said "But for his illness the President would have delivered the speech according to schedule; but this being prevented, he now feels that it should go to the public through the medium of the press and for the information and consideration of the people."
- Suspended Labour MP James Maxton finally apologized for his remarks of June 27 and was readmitted to the House of Commons.
- In Britain, royal assent was given to several bills, including the Oxford and Cambridge Bill and Lady Astor's liquor sales restriction bill.
- British Prime Minister Stanley Baldwin's cabinet voted to approve the report of a cabinet subcommittee that formally approved the British Mandate for Palestine and endorsed the 1917 Balfour Declaration. The legally binding document was the first official British report for the policy of Zionism and the creation of a Jewish state in Palestine.
- The Spanish Basketball Federation (Federación Española de Baloncesto or FEB), which oversees Spain's professional and amateur leagues, was founded in Barcelona.
- The cargo ship SS Lesbian was launched by Ellerman Lines from the Swan, Hunter and Wigham Richardson shipbuilders in Liverpool. The freighter was named in honor of the inhabitants of the Greek island of Lesbos rather than for the lesbian sexual orientation.
- Born:
  - Ahmet Ertegün, Turkish-born American businessman, founder and president of Atlantic Records; in Istanbul, Turkey (d. 2006)
  - Democrito Mendoza, Philippine labor activist; in Liloan, Cebu, Philippines (d. 2016)
  - Joseph Keller, American mathematician; in Paterson, New Jersey, United States (d. 2016)
  - Stephanie Kwolek, American chemist; in New Kensington, Pennsylvania, United States (d. 2014)
