= Oliver King (composer) =

British composer, pianist, organist, and conductor

Oliver Arthur King (5 July 1855, Islington, London – 23 August 1923, Hammersmith, London) was a British composer, pianist, organist and conductor.

Oliver King started learning piano at 6-years old, he was noticed by Joseph Barnby for his talent, and made King a choirboy in the St. Andrew's Church which he excelled in the role. He learned the organ and became a deputy organ and assistant to Joseph Barnby until 1874 when he moved to Leipzig to study at the Conservatory. After Leipzig, King moved back to London as a skilled pianist and was appointed the pianist to Princess Louise in 1879. During her trip to Ottawa, King played in several performances, touring across Canada and America as a pianist and composer.

After his stay in North America from 1879 to 1883, King moved back to London, with his reputation of being the pianist to Her Royal Highness Princess Louise, he became the organist of the Novello Oratarios and a popular composer of chants and anthems. He wrote a concert-overture "Among the Pines" which won a prize from the Royal Philharmonic Society. His popularity was only in England and he wasn't able to achieve much fame in the rest of Europe. His performance activity died down, although a professor of piano in the Royal Academy of Music, his main musical activities lessened especially after the beginning of the 20th-century, and King died at the age of 68 in Hammersmith.

== Biography ==
=== Early life and education ===
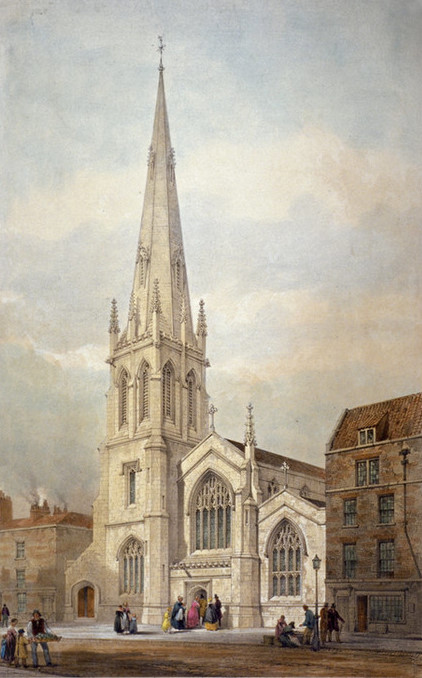
St Andrew's Church, Wells Street, Marylebone

Oliver Arthur King was born in 1855 in Islington, he was introduced to the piano at 6-years-old, and was noticed to have an early talent for the instrument, and by the time King was 8, he was noticed and taught by Joseph Barnby who was the choirmaster of St. Andrew's Church by Wells Street in London. In St. Andrew's Church, King was a chorister who had to frequently perform, particularly on Wednesday and Sunday services, King was noted for his talents and was soon co-teaching younger kids in singing as well as learning the organ, which he soon took up a position playing and singing during Wednesday and Sunday services. However, King was also mischievous, and received the name Scaramouch for his actions, and was often beaten with a cane, which proved ineffective, and instead was placed with the younger boys as a form of humiliation, which was effective.

By 16, King and Barnby moved to the St. Anne's church in Soho, Westminster, there King was the deputy organist and an assistant to Barnaby. Around this time, King was taught piano by William Henry Holmes in the Royal Academy of Music for three years, until 1874 when Henry Littleton (the head and business director of music publisher Novello, Ewer and Co.) took notice of the boy and advised him move to Leipzig, singing and studying choir in the Thomasschule zu Leipzig under Ernst Richter and studying in the Leipzig Conservatory for piano and composition under Carl Reinecke, Salomon Jadassohn and Oscar Paul. King was a dedicated student, having tried to branch out into as many music-related fields as possible, including (unsuccessfully) learning flute during his stay in the Royal Academy and trying to learn violin under Friedrich Hermann and Henry Schradieck, however King would frequently spend ten hours a day on musical studies which only progressed slowly, and he eventually decided to make a career out of composing and playing piano.

In 1877, Oliver King wrote a piano concerto (dedicated to his teacher Carl Reinecke) in which King premiered as both a conductor and composer, this was to be his last major moment in Leipzig as he moved back to London that same year.

=== Career ===
Upon Oliver King's return to London in 1877, he faced a question of whether to teach music or compose and become a pianist, his friends were supportive of teaching as it was a more stable job, however King decided to take a career path in composing, being a pianist and even conducting. He joined the London Musical Society as a pianist, and became a frequent conductor of the Isleworth Choral Society and Royal Albert Hall Choral Society. In fact, in 1873, King premiered as a pianist playing a piano concerto composed by Carl von Weber. In 1879, Oliver King was appointed as the pianist to Princess Louise for her trip to Ottawa, Canada, and he travelled to Canada on 22 December.

==== Travelling in Canada and America ====
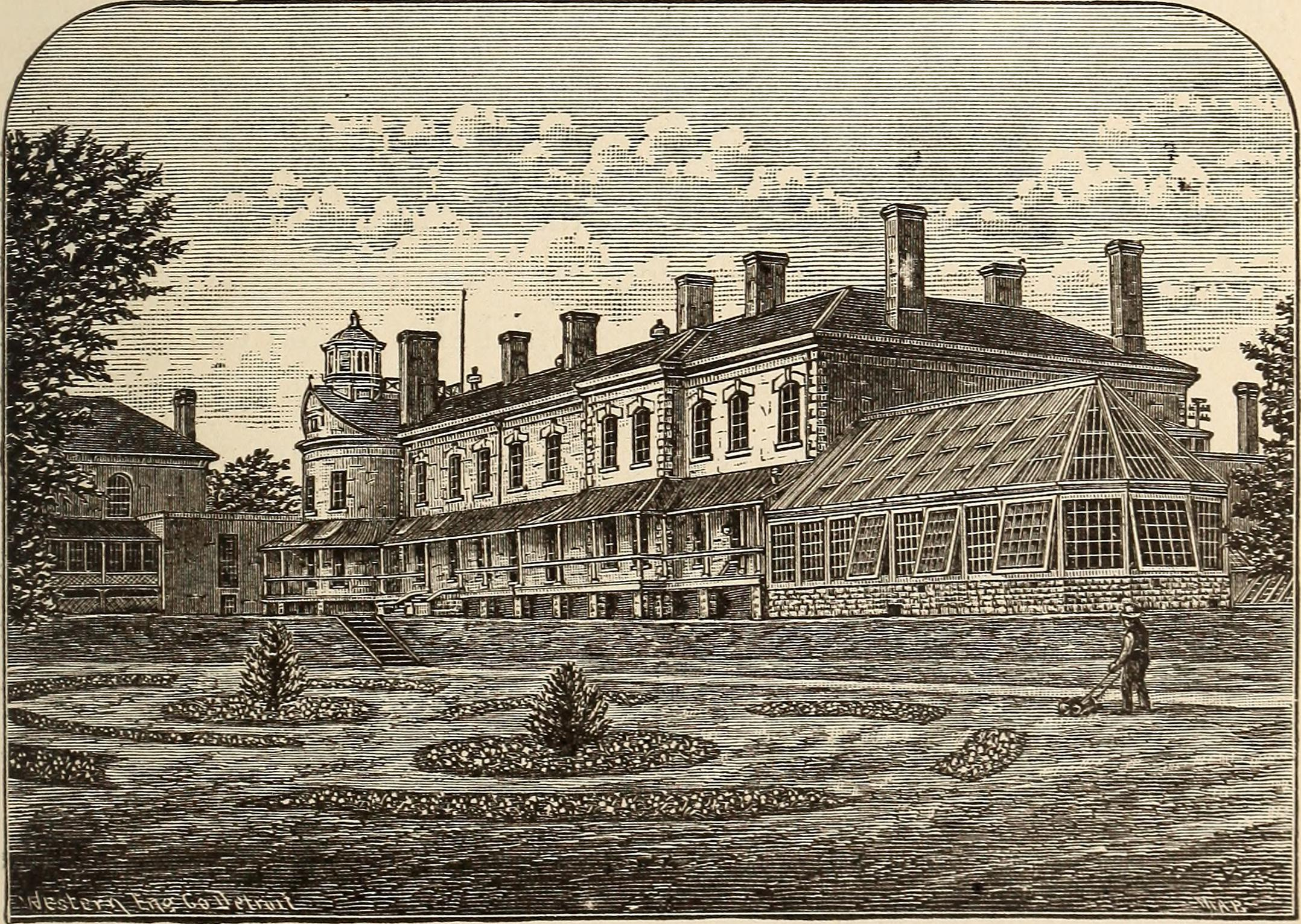
Rideau Hall, Ottawa, Canada

King took up a residence in a hotel near Rideau Hall, here King would frequently work on many pieces for the piano and also for orchestra, including his Symphony in F major "Night" which was composed (or at least completed) in 1880. King would practice piano (A Kirkman) which was nearby the room where Princess Louise stayed in, Louise would often compliment and be impressed by King's play, and they would often play together, along with Montreal violinist Russell Stephenson. The trio's performances were a highlight of culture in Ottawa, and particularly of Rideau Street. Besides his work with Princess Louise in Ottawa, King would frequently tour across Quebec and other parts of Ontario, he accompanied Lord Archibald Campbell (1846-1913) during the latter's visit to Quebec in 1880. Also around this time, King saw the premiere of his Night Symphony in Boston, to which he dedicated to Princess Louise. (Note: Oliver King went to Boston in 1880, and had 2 concerts, a Monday concert on 11 October 1880 performing works of Bach, Liszt, Schumann, etc... and a Friday performance on 15 October 1880 performing his Piano concerto and Chopin's Ballade in A-flat, his symphony and concert overture was conducted by Bernhard Listemann with the Boston Philharmonic Orchestra (at the time called the Boston Philharmonic Club and unrelated to the modern Boston Philharmonic Orchestra).)

Besides playing with royalty, King frequently performed in Ottawa in public, these concerts were originally mildly successful, however over time King's popularity grew, and so did the success of these concerts. These concerts brought newer styles of music from Europe, particularly from Germany and England. However, in December 1881, Oliver King moved to New York City for composition and performing. These compositions were usually church music, he wrote many anthems such as The star that now is shining, Sing a song of praise. From these compositions, he most likely may have not made a lot of money off these compositions, as they would be sold for ~12 cents each ($3.68 in 2022 USD), however he was popular in America as he toured frequently, and was the organist of the Church of the Holy Innocents in New York. The piano piece Gavotte was a popular hit in America, and 2 pieces which were composed in Ottawa, Curfew and Slumber Song, were still popular in the states.

==== Return to London ====
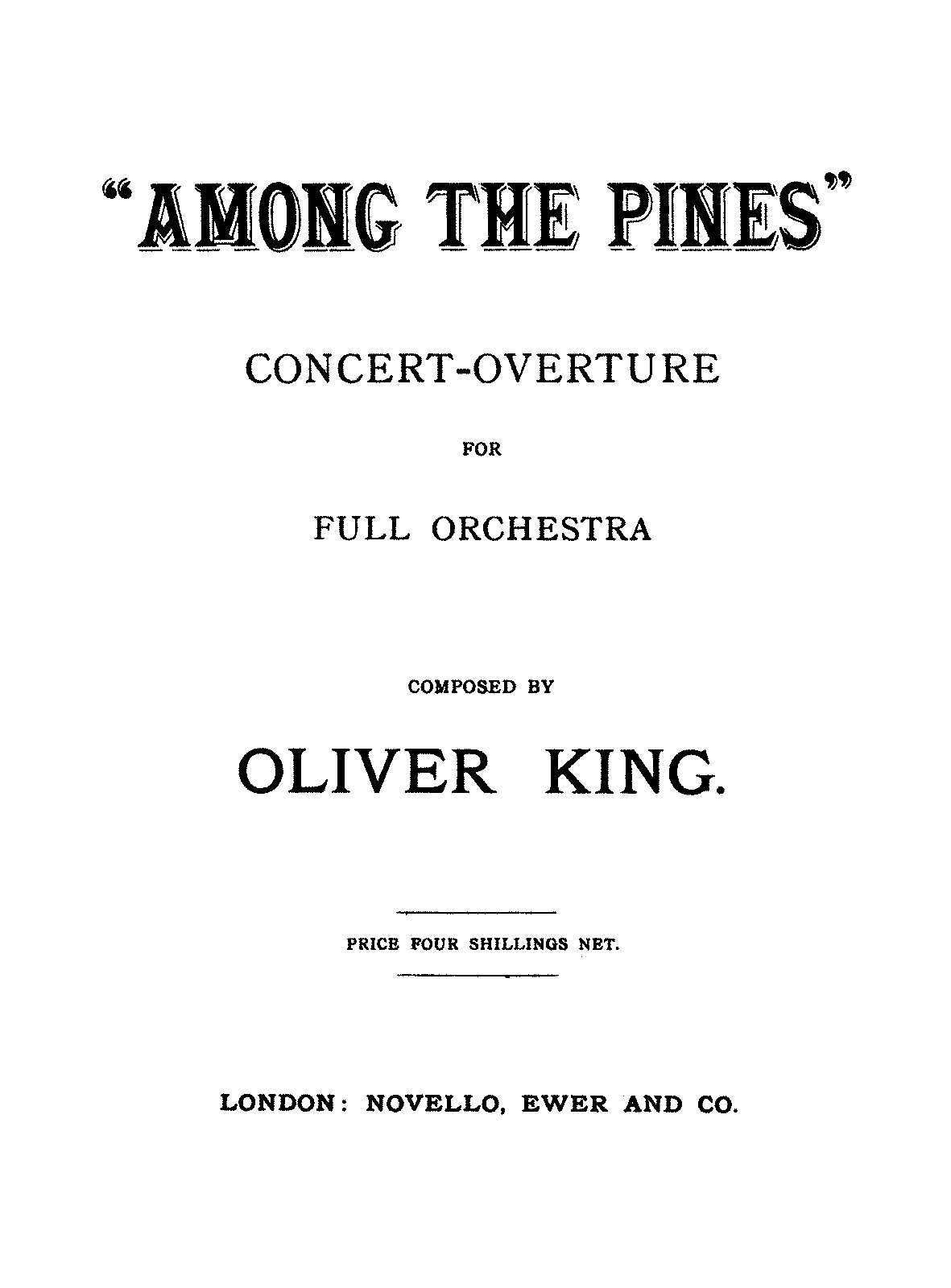
"Among the Pines", Concert-Overture Cover Page

In 1883, Oliver King moved back to London. In early 1882, he already made his plan to go back to England, he received letters from Joseph Barnby about assistance as an organist in the St. Anne's Church in Soho. However, King went on to become the organist and musical director of the Marylebone Church from 1883 to 1886, he gave numerous concerts at the church and outside the church. For example, he gave performances of Bach and other choral and religious works, but gave an England-premiere performance of his piano concerto on 7 November 1885 under the conductorship of Wilhelm Ganz in a newly built concertroom in St James's Hall, this performance was part of an event held by John Brinsmead, a London-based piano maker, and by the end of the event a prize was given by Brinsmead and William George Cusins to King for his piano concerto. Also during this time period, King became the organist of the Novello Oratario Concerts, where he would play many works and compose many works under Novello, Ewer and Co. music publishers. In 1883, the London Philharmonic Society created a composition competition where the winner would receive 10 pounds (~£1,300 in 2022 GBP), here King wrote his most significant piece, an overture titled "Among the Pines", this work was in competition with 46 other overtures including those composed by Michael Costa, and Julius Benedict. The overture was performed under the baton of William George Cusins, with great success, winning first place. The Musical Times in 1883 commented about the overture, saying the Allegro's "Themes are so good, and their orchestral treatment so attractive, that we can hear them again with pleasure, and still have the zest for their recapitulation in the second part."

In 1886, King resigned his position in the Marylebone church, during this time he toured around Britain, Ireland and the Netherlands as pianist, however he also composed heavily, during the time between 1886 and 1893 he wrote 4 significant works: Psalm 137, by the Waters of Babylon (1888) a choral work which premiered in the Chester Music Festival, and received numerous more performances during the 1890s; a violin concerto in G-minor (1887), and another concert-overture in the key of D minor (1888), and the 4th significant work is a part-song called Soldier rest, thy warfare o'er (1893), this work was very popular in his day and was based on already existing text. In 1893, Oliver King became a professor of piano in the Royal Academy of Music, and King most likely took on a life with less public performances, (Note: He still performed in the academy halls, in fact on his earliest contributions to the academy was organize and participate in a recital including only-recent members and professors of the Royal Academy.) he still continued composing, writing three cantatas from 1893 to 1897, the first called Proserpina (Before 1895?) is written for a chorus of female voices, and soloist and for orchestra, the second Romance of the Roses (1895) has lyrics written by Ellis Walton, a British composer and lyricist, the 3rd cantata was The Sands o' (of) Dee written in 1897-98 with words based on text by Charles Kingsley.

=== 1900-Death ===
After 1900 there is very little recorded activity, it is known he still composed, however often re-published previous works, newer significant works were The Three Fishers (1908), the Carol-anthem In A Stable Lowly (1913) and Ye Shall Go Out with Joy (1913), which was mentioned in the Press after publication and The Musical Times giving praise. His works were still popular, even used in teachings and were examples in music competitions.

On 23 August 1923, the unmarried and childless Oliver King was announced dead, in the December 1923 publishings of The Musical Times, a separate section titled "The late Oliver King" was made written by a friend whose initials are "H. K." and lived in The Clergy House and in Wilton Place. The person states how talented King was in his young age, however failed to "fulfill the promise of his early youth."

== Compositions ==
Although a prolific composer in choral work, many of King's works have been forgotten, and none have a recording except for a Pavan for Organ in Track 4 of PRCD1193 (Priory Records) and Prelude for Lent, (Op 10 No. 2; for Organ and Choral or just Organ) which is on Hyperion Records.

This is not an exhaustive list, it will only feature the more notable of pieces.

=== List of Compositions ===
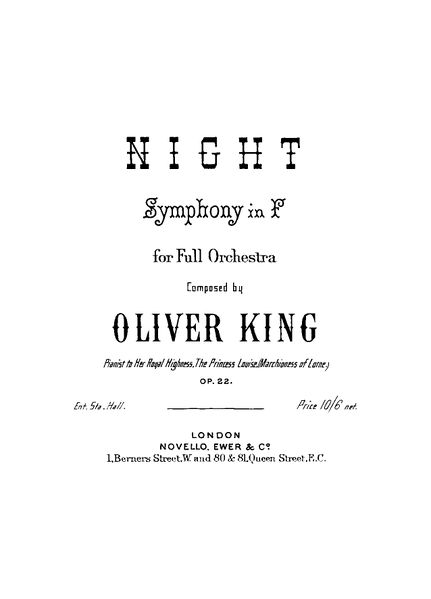
"Night" Symphony by Oliver King (1880)

==== Vocal ====
50+ anthems, canons, part songs, vocal duets, songs, hymns etc.

- Curfew (1879–80)
- Slumber Song (1879–80)
- The star that now is shining (before 1883)
- Sing a song of praise (before 1883)
- Soldier rest, thy warfare o'er (1883)
- Israfel (1885?, published 1890; based on the poem Israfel by Edgar Allan Poe)
- In A Stable Lowly for 4 voices and organ (1913)
- Ye Shall Go Out with Joy (1913)

Cantatas

- Proserpina (Before 1895?)
- Romance of the Roses (1895), with lyrics by women composer and lyricist Ellis Walton
- The Sands o' Dee (1897–98), with lyrics based on text by Charles Kingsley
- The Naiades (????)

Other

- Psalm 137, by the Waters of Babylon (1888) (For solo, chorus, and orchestra)
- The Three Fishers (1908) a ballade and poem for chorus and orchestra based on Charles Kingsley's poem Three Fishers

==== Orchestra with/without accompaniment ====
Only Orchestra

- Symphony in F major (1880)
- Overture (1880)
- Concert-Overture "Among the Pines" (1883)
- Concert-Overture in D minor (1888)

With Instrument soloist

- Piano concerto (1877, rev. 1885)
- Violin concerto in G minor (1887)

==== Other ====
- Impromptu-Caprice (Unknown instrumentation; 1883 or before)
- Gavotte (For piano; 1882 or before)
- Organ sonata (1891)
- Violin and Piano sonata in D minor (Before 1887)
- 12 morceaux caracteristiques pour Violin et Pianoforte (1895)
- Berceuse for Organ (~1898)
- Prelude for Lent Op. 10 no. 2 (~1883)
- Fantasia based on a theme by Hermann Goetz (1883)
- In Collaboration with Ernest Halsey (all for organ; 1908):
  - Cantillena in A♭
  - Toccata in C
  - March Funebre
- 2 Compositions for Organ (1895)
- Andantino for Organ (1913)
- Berceuse, Andantino, Meditation, and Valse (1879)
- Ballade (dedicated to Teresa Russel; 1893)

=== Composition style ===
The works of Oliver King tends to reflect the German styles in the Leipzig Conservatory, particularly his admiration for Richard Wagner. In an 1882 interview with Pennsylvanian Newspaper Quiz, King recalls a story of his time in Leipzig, where he and his friends would often (drunkenly) play Wagner pieces using a piano, tables, and drawers, usually the Tannhauser Overture. In that same interview, Quiz described King's style as "modern", and this "modern" description would carry on through King's lifetime, although "modern" in the 1880s and 1890s sense. as King got older, his German influence got lesser, and King began developing his own style. Even besides choral work, his pieces contained a polyphonic structure with a strong and bold texture yet still able to have emotional meanings and technical difficulty. The Musical Times describe King as very "ambitious" and with "high-aspirations" and "thorough conscientiousness", however some piano pieces were described "crowding as many notes as possible", and that King "must speak his art in a plainer language." However, overall his works seemed "effective" and well-appreciated among the musical society of England, Canada, and America.

His style post-1900 was still considered "effective" and in his piece The Three Fishers (1908), his musical output was "fresh" as reviewed positively by The Musical Times.
