= Spanish Communist Workers' Party =

Spanish Communist Workers' Party may refer to:

- Spanish Communist Workers' Party (1921)
- Spanish Communist Workers' Party (1973)
