= SS Leicester =

Coordinates: 51°04′N 1°15′E

History
- Name: SS Leicester
- Operator: 1891–1897: Manchester, Sheffield and Lincolnshire Railway; 1897–1916: Great Central Railway
- Port of registry: (United Kingdom)
- Builder: Earle's Shipbuilding, Hull
- Launched: 8 June 1891
- Fate: Sunk 12 February 1916

General characteristics
- Tonnage: 1,002 gross register tons (GRT)
- Length: 240.6 feet (73.3 m)
- Beam: 32 feet (9.8 m)
- Depth: 14.8 feet (4.5 m)

SS Leicester was a passenger and cargo vessel built for the Manchester, Sheffield and Lincolnshire Railway in 1891.

== History ==
The ship was built by Earle's Shipbuilding in Hull and launched on 8 June 1891 by Mrs. Alford Green, wife of Major Alford Green of the Manchester, Sheffield and Lincolnshire Railway. Until 1891, the company had named its vessels after stations on its network, but the four vessels launched in 1891 were named after stations which were on the planned line to London.

In 1897 the MS and LR became the Great Central Railway. On 8 May 1913, the Royal Navy destroyer HMS Express struck Leicester in the dock at Grimsby and damaged her.

On 12 February 1916 Leicester struck a mine and sank in the English Channel 2.5 nautical miles (4.6 km) south east of Folkestone, Kent, with the loss of 17 of her crew.
