= Philip D. McNamara =

American Catholic priest

Father Philip D. McNamara (August 30, 1923 – November 2, 2016) was a Catholic priest who directed the Catholic Relief Services in Cambodia during the Vietnam War.

== Biography ==
Philip was born in East Boston, Massachusetts, on August 30, 1923. He was the fifth of the six sons of fireman Michael McNamara and his wife, Catherine McPhee. They later moved to Clinton, Massachusetts, where Philip attended Clinton High School and then St. Charles College and the Seminary of Philosophy in Montreal. He completed his studies for the priesthood at the Grand séminaire de Montréal.

He was ordained by Bishop John J. Wright at St. Paul Cathedral (Diocese of Worcester) on May 18, 1950. He was appointed an associate pastor at St. Patrick Parish, Whitinsville's Our Lady of the Rosary Clinton and St. Joseph Parish, Leicester, before becoming a U.S. Air Force Chaplain in 1954. In military service he followed his older brothers James, Leonard, Joseph and Edmund who served in WWII. His younger brother Billy served in the marines during the Korean war.

Upon his return from the service in 1957, Father McNamara was appointed an associate pastor at St. Pius X Parish, Leicester, until 1961 when he was named an assistant director of Catholic Charities. He graduated from the Boston College School of Social Work with a master's degree in June 1964.

On March 17, 1968, he was granted a leave for service with the Catholic Relief Services on the refugee aid team in South Vietnam. He returned to Catholic Charities in 1969 before being appointed as pastor of Our Lady of the Rosary Parish, Clinton, in February 1970. In 1973, he was granted another leave to return to CRS as director, serving in Cambodia until 1974.

While stationed in Cambodia, he was awarded the Medal of the Commander of Sowathara by Cambodian President Lon Nol just before his departure from Southeast Asia in July 1974.

From 1975 to 1979, Father McNamara was assistant director and interim director of Catholic Charities. When the Khmer Rouge regime fell and refugees flooded across the borders, he was asked to return to Southeast Asia, this time, Thailand, to help to establish refugee camps. Later he was asked to serve in Lebanon, also with refugees.

He returned to his duties in Catholic Charities in 1982 where he served as assistant director until his retirement August 1, 1993.

== Awards and recognitions ==
- Medal of the Commander of Sowathara Cambodia
