= SS Swiftstar =

20th c. US steam tanker

History

United States
- Name: Swiftstar
- Owner: Swiftsure Oil Transport Co.
- Operator: Swiftsure Oil Transport Co. (February–August 1921); C. D. Mallory & Co. (August 1921–1923)
- Ordered: 12 April 1920
- Builder: Northwest Steel Co., Portland
- Cost: US$2,400,000.00
- Yard number: 42
- Laid down: 1920
- Launched: 5 February 1921
- Sponsored by: Mrs. Nelson Bowles
- Commissioned: 26 February 1921
- Maiden voyage: 6 March 1921
- Home port: New York
- Identification: US Official Number 221071; Call sign MCLK
- Fate: Disappeared in July 1923

General characteristics
- Type: Tanker
- Tonnage: 8,207 GRT; 5,092 NRT; 12,020 DWT
- Length: 464 ft 4 in (141.53 m)
- Beam: 60 ft 2 in (18.34 m)
- Draft: 26 ft 8 in (8.13 m) (loaded)
- Depth: 27 ft 7 in (8.41 m)
- Installed power: 662 Nhp, 3,200 ihp
- Propulsion: Hooven, Owens & Rentschler 3-cylinder triple expansion
- Speed: 10 1/2 knots (12.1 mph; 19.4 km/h)

Swiftstar was a steam tanker built in 1920-1921 by Northwest Bridge & Iron Company of Portland for the Swiftsure Oil Transport Co., a subsidiary of the France & Canada Steamship Co., with intention of transporting oil from foreign ports to refineries along the Gulf and East Coasts of the United States. The ship had short but troubled history. In July 1923 after departing Colón the tanker went missing. Large oil slick, burnt remnants and several lifeboats bearing the ships's name were later found indicating the ship exploded. All 32 people on board were presumed lost.

== Design and construction ==
On 14 August 1918 the Emergency Fleet Corporation (EFC) signed a contract with the Northwest Steel Co. to build ten vessels of approximately 8,800 deadweight. After realizing that there was no need for so many cargo vessels, but rather there existed a shortage of tankers, EFC rescinded its contractual obligations on six of the remaining ships on 15 September 1919. At the same time, Swiftsure Oil Transport Co. was looking to place an order to build seven oil carrying vessels of approximately 12,000 deadweight provided it could get financing from EFC to do that. As a result, on 12 April 1920 EFC, Swiftsure Oil Transport Co. and Northwest Steel Co. entered into agreement by which EFC would finance construction of seven tankers at a price of US$2,400,00.00 each, Swiftsure Oil Transport Co. would have to repay the borrowed funds to the Fleet Corporation over 12 years, and Northwest Steel Co. agreed to release EFC from all claims arising from the Fleet Corporation's decision to cancel the remaining six vessels. Swiftstar was the third of these vessels and was laid down at the builder's shipyard in Portland (yard number 42) and launched on 5 February 1921, with Mrs. Nelson Bowles of Seattle serving as the sponsor. The ship was shelter-deck type, had two main decks and was built on the Isherwood principle of longitudinal framing providing extra strength to the body of the vessel. The vessel was equipped with wireless of De Forest type and had electrical lights installed along the decks. The tanker had a cargo pump room located amidships, and had ten double main cargo tanks constructed throughout the vessel with a total capacity to carry approximately 75,000 barrels of oil.

As built, the ship was 464 feet 4 inches (141.53 m) long (between perpendiculars) and 60 feet 2 inches (18.34 m) abeam, and had a depth of 27 feet 7 inches (8.41 m). Swiftstar was originally assessed at 8,207 GRT and 5,092 NRT and had deadweight of approximately 12,020. The vessel had a steel hull with double bottom extending under her forepeak and boiler room, and a single 662 Nhp (3,200 ihp) vertical triple expansion steam engine, with cylinders of 27 1/2-inch (70 cm), 46-inch (120 cm) and 78-inch (200 cm) diameter with a 51-inch (130 cm) stroke, that drove a single screw propeller and moved the ship at up to 10 1/2 knots (12.1 mph; 19.4 km/h). The steam for the engine was supplied by three single-ended Scotch boilers fitted for oil.

Following the successful completion of the sea trials held on February 23 and 24, Swiftstar was turned over to the Fleet Corporation one day later and transferred to Swiftsure Oil Transport Co. per contract agreement on February 26.

== Operational history ==
After delivery to her owners the tanker departed Portland in ballast on 26 February 1921 for San Francisco and arrived there on March 1. After loading fuel and supplies, the vessel left San Francisco on March 6 in ballast heading to Tampico where she was to load a cargo of oil, and from there she were to proceed to New York. The tanker was initially employed in carrying oil from Mexican ports of Tampico, Túxpan, Puerto Lobos and Tecomate to New York, however, in late spring 1921 a fight erupted between the owners of United States Mail Steamship Company headed by Charles and Francis R. Mayer and the USSB. Mayers were also at the helm of France & Canada Steamship Co., and 75% stockholders in Swiftsure Oil Transport Co. As Mayers became involved with US Mail Steamship Line affair in summer 1921, the bondholders of Swiftsure Oil Transport Co. took over the management of the company, and placed all seven tankers owned by the company under operation by C.D. Mallory & Co. Swiftstar was then assigned temporarily to carry oil from Mexico to the Gulf ports of Galveston and Port Arthur. In addition, towards the end of the year, she started making trips from Mexico to refining facilities of New England Oil Refining Company in Fall River. The tanker continued serving this route through the end of August 1922. Following a decline in the production of Mexican oilfields around that time, the tanker along with many other vessels, was instead rerouted to carry oil from Californian oilfields to Fall River.

=== Grounding in 1922 ===
Swiftstar passed through Panama Canal on her first trip on new route on 3 September 1922 bound for San Pedro, and after taking on 10,132 tons (~70,000 barrels) of oil from the terminals of the Union Oil Company, departed for her return journey on 19 September 1922 under command of captain Kenney, who was replacing her usual commander, captain James P. Stevenson. The journey was largely uneventful, until the evening of October 10. At around 17:00 the ship was deemed to be approximately thirty miles south of Block Island. By about 18:00 heavy fog spread out through the area reducing visibility to about 300 yards. At about 20:43 while still travelling in fog the tanker suddenly ran aground on the southern side of Block Island. Distress calls were made and picked up by the local life-saving station, as well as in New York and Fall River. The fog finally dissipated around midnight and the crew could see themselves lying broadside to the beach no more than 50 yards away. At about 06:00 on October 11 tug Guardsman showed up at the scene, but was unable to render any assistance and returned to New London. As Swiftstar went hard on the beach, she injured her bottom with many holds being punctured and leaking. Several pumps became inoperable due to them being filled with sand, two boilers went extinguished, and the engine room was continuously leaking. Standard Oil tanker Eocene soon arrived and offered to tow the stricken vessel, but her offer was declined on the fears Swiftstar would break in tow and sink. By 11:00 the after-peak bulkhead finally gave in and the engine room got flooded very rapidly cutting off the dynamo and severing any means of communications. At around 15:00 submarine N-2 appeared in sight and by 16:15 it closed in to within 150 yards. Using lifeboats from minesweeper Chewink, N-2 was able to take off all 33 people on board the tanker in three trips. After abandoning the ship, the crew was taken by the submarine to New Harbor where they were safely landed two hours later.

After four days of work the vessel was finally dislodged from her position in the morning of October 15 by wrecking tug Resolute and towed to New London for temporary repairs. After review, it was discovered that only three tanks were punctured during the grounding. The ship was then towed to the yard of Newport News Shipbuilding & Drydock Company in mid-November 1922, where repairs at a cost of US$171,500.00 were performed. The repairs were finished in early January 1923 and the tanker returned to her regular service soon thereafter, sailing for Tampico on 11 January 1923.

Following her return to service, Swiftstar reentered intercoastal service carrying oil from California to Fall River for the rest of her career, while still making occasional trips to Mexico.

In June 1923 while en route from Providence to San Pedro, one of the sailors was arrested on board the tanker and put in chains after a wireless message was received identifying him as a suspect in murder and robbery committed in Rhode Island.

=== Disappearance ===
Swiftstar cleared for her last voyage from San Pedro with a cargo of 11,400 tons of crude oil (~79,000 barrels) on 30 June 1923 bound for Fall River. The tanker was under command of captain Richard Hull and had a crew of thirty two men. The tanker passed through the Panama Canal on 13 July 1923 and took course to her final destination. The tanker was expected at Fall River between July 23 and July 25, but she never arrived at that port, nor were any distress signals were received by any vessels along her expected route. On 22 July 1923, the schooner Albert H. Willis, on her way to the island of San Andrés to pick up a cargo of copra, sighted a wreckage close to the island shore. As the schooner closed in to investigate, the crew discovered a large number of splinters floating everywhere in the oil-covered sea, in addition to two wooden and one steel rudderless lifeboats. Each lifeboat had the name Swiftstar written on the stern. A lookout also spotted a floating box of approximately 8 feet long, 4 feet wide and 5 feet deep. It was picked up and hoisted on board the vessel, and on further examination it was deemed to be an icebox. Upon opening, it was discovered that the box contained a charred body of a man whose identity was impossible to establish. The body was buried on San Andrés island before the schooner continued on her voyage.

According to one theory advanced after the accident, a lightning strike was most likely responsible for the tragedy. As it struck the tanker amidships, it knocked out the dynamo thus preventing the vessel to send out a distress call. It also caused two adjacent tanks to explode breaking the ship in two with both halves sinking rapidly, and therefore preventing any fire or smoke developing that could have been observed by passing ships. Finally, the charred body probably belonged to a man who was killed by the lightning outright with his body being thrown into the icebox.

One of the Swiftstar sailors, John Paquette, later showed up at Fall River aboard another tanker, SS Swifteagle. Apparently, he had been detained in Panama after attempting to smuggle a bottle of liquor into Canal Zone and as a result missed his ship and avoided the fate of the rest of the crew.
