= Congressional Baseball Game =

Annual baseball game played by members of the United States Congress

The Congressional Baseball Game for Charity
- vs.
- Location: Washington, DC
- Teams: Democratic Party; Republican Party
- First meeting: 1909
- Latest meeting: 2026: Republicans (11–2)
- Broadcasters: C-SPAN; Fox Sports 1
- Stadiums: 1909: American League Park II; 1911: Georgetown Field; 1912–1919: National Park; 1926–1957: Griffith Stadium; 1962–1968: D.C. Stadium; 1969–1972: RFK Stadium; 1973–1976: Memorial Stadium; 1977: Langley High School; 1978–1994: Four Mile Run Park; 1995–2004: Prince George's Stadium; 2005–2007: RFK Stadium; 2008–present: Nationals Park

Statistics
- Most wins: Republicans: 48
- All-time record: 48–42 (Republicans lead)
- Largest victory: 1928: Democrats (36–4)
- Smallest victory: 1983: none (17–17)
- Website: congressionalbaseball.org

The Congressional Baseball Game for Charity is an annual baseball game played each summer by members of the United States Congress. The game began as a casual event among colleagues in 1909 and eventually evolved into one of Washington, D.C.'s most anticipated annual pastimes, according to the House of Representatives Office of the Historian. In the game, Republicans and Democrats form separate teams and play against each other.

Today, the game raises money for four charities: the Boys and Girls Clubs of Greater Washington, the Washington Nationals Dream Foundation, the Washington Literacy Center, and—following a pre-game practice shooting in 2017—the US Capitol Police Memorial Fund. The game is usually attended by crowds of congressional staffers, congressional families and, occasionally, even dignitaries and US presidents.

== History ==
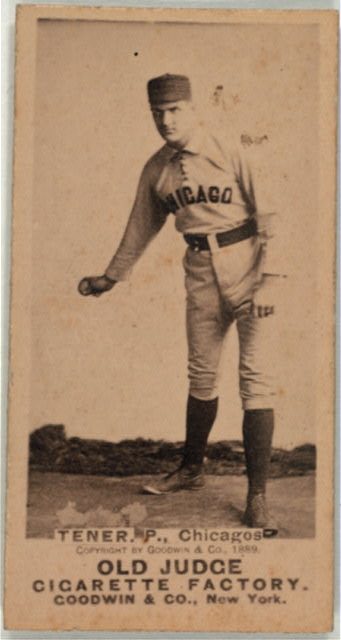
John Tener organized the first Congressional baseball game

The 1909 game was organized by Representative John Tener of Pennsylvania, a former professional baseball player. The Boston Daily Globe observed, "The game was brewing for weeks and the members of the house were keyed up a high pitch of enthusiasm. Deep, dark rumors were in circulation that 'ringers' would be introduced, but when they lined up at 4 o'clock the nine Republicans were stalwart, grand old party men, while the Democrats were of the pure Jeffersonian strain."

The Democrats beat their Republican opponents, 26–16 in the first game, and continued their winning streak for the first six games. Republicans won their first game in 1916. Due to its growing popularity, the Congressional Baseball Game was first covered via radio in 1928. The radio broadcast continued in succeeding years.

The event has, at times, interrupted the workflow of Congress. In 1914, Speaker James Beauchamp "Champ" Clark of Missouri became frustrated with the Congressional Baseball Game interfering with legislative business. Once, the House was to debate an appropriations bill on Civil War cotton damage, but a quorum was not present because of the game.

Despite its appeal, the annual game occurred intermittently because of interruptions due to the Great Depression, the Second World War, and intervention by the House leadership. The game was held biennially until the Washington Evening Star newspaper sponsored it annually from 1946 to 1958. Despite the sponsorship, Speaker Sam Rayburn of Texas ended the game in 1958, saying it had become too physically straining on the members and was causing injuries. With the new sponsor, the Roll Call Trophy was created, for the team that wins each best-of-five series. It was first awarded in 1965 to the Republican team, the first team to win three games since Roll Call had begun its sponsorship. From 1965, a new trophy was awarded to the next team to win three games (over the next three, four, or five years), following the year in which the most recent trophy was awarded. When the Congressional Sports for Charity nonprofit was formed in 2016, the Roll Call trophy was retired; 14 trophies had been awarded—ten to the Republicans' team and four to the Democrats' team.

On June 14, 2017, one day before the annual event, a gunman opened fire on Republican members of Congress who were practicing for the next day's game. Four people were shot including House Majority Whip Steve Scalise. The gunman was killed by Capitol Police. The Federal Bureau of Investigation classified the shooting as an act of domestic terrorism. Despite discussions about postponing the game, it was held as scheduled. The shooting resulted in a dramatic increase in interest for the game; it was reported that revenue from ticket sales and online donations had exceeded $1 million, and organizers stated that 24,959 people were in attendance. C-SPAN announced that it would televise the game, and the 2021 game was televised by FS1 as well.

== Locations ==
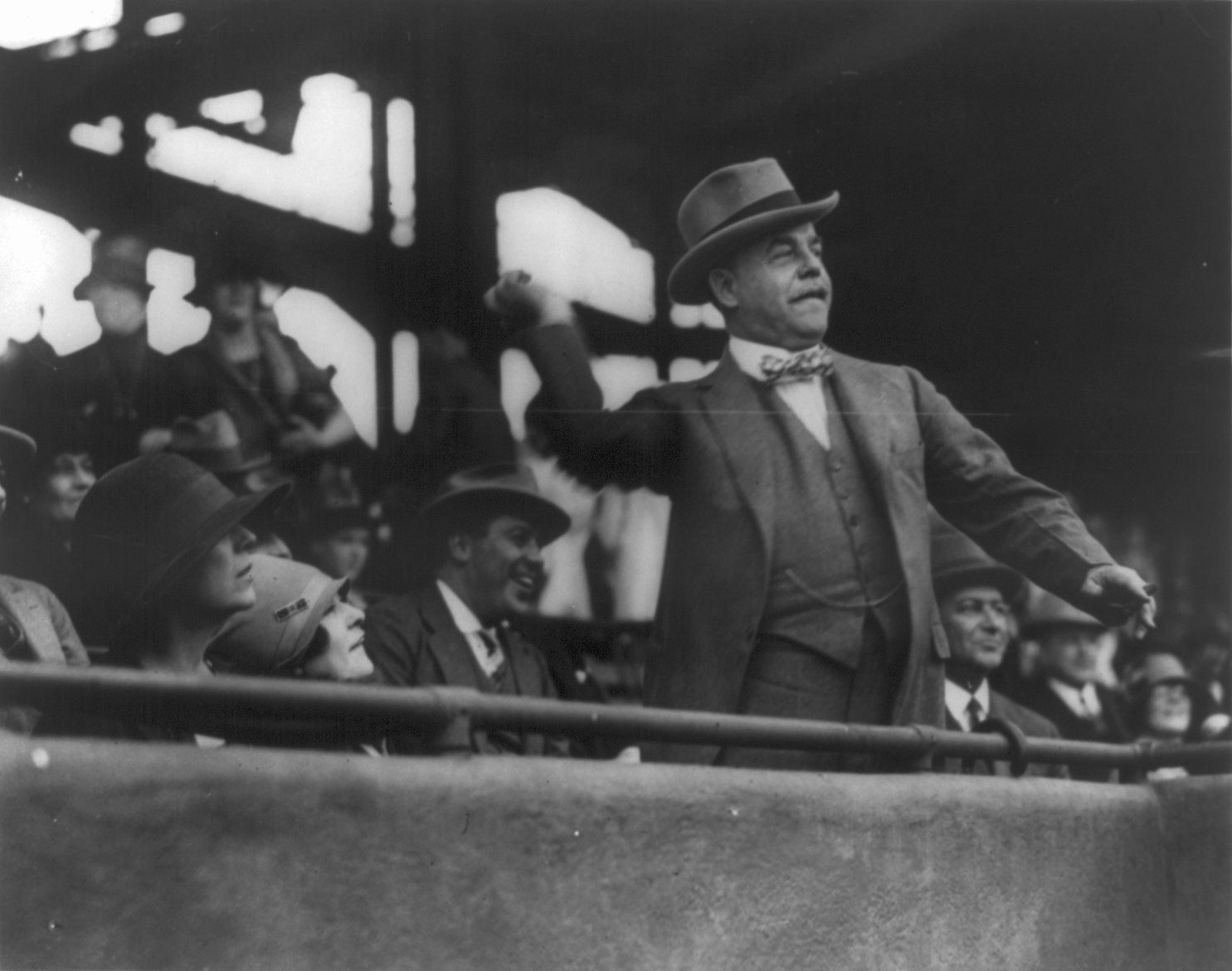
Speaker Longworth throws out the first ball at the starting game at Griffith Stadium, Mrs. Longworth seated below, May 3, 1928.

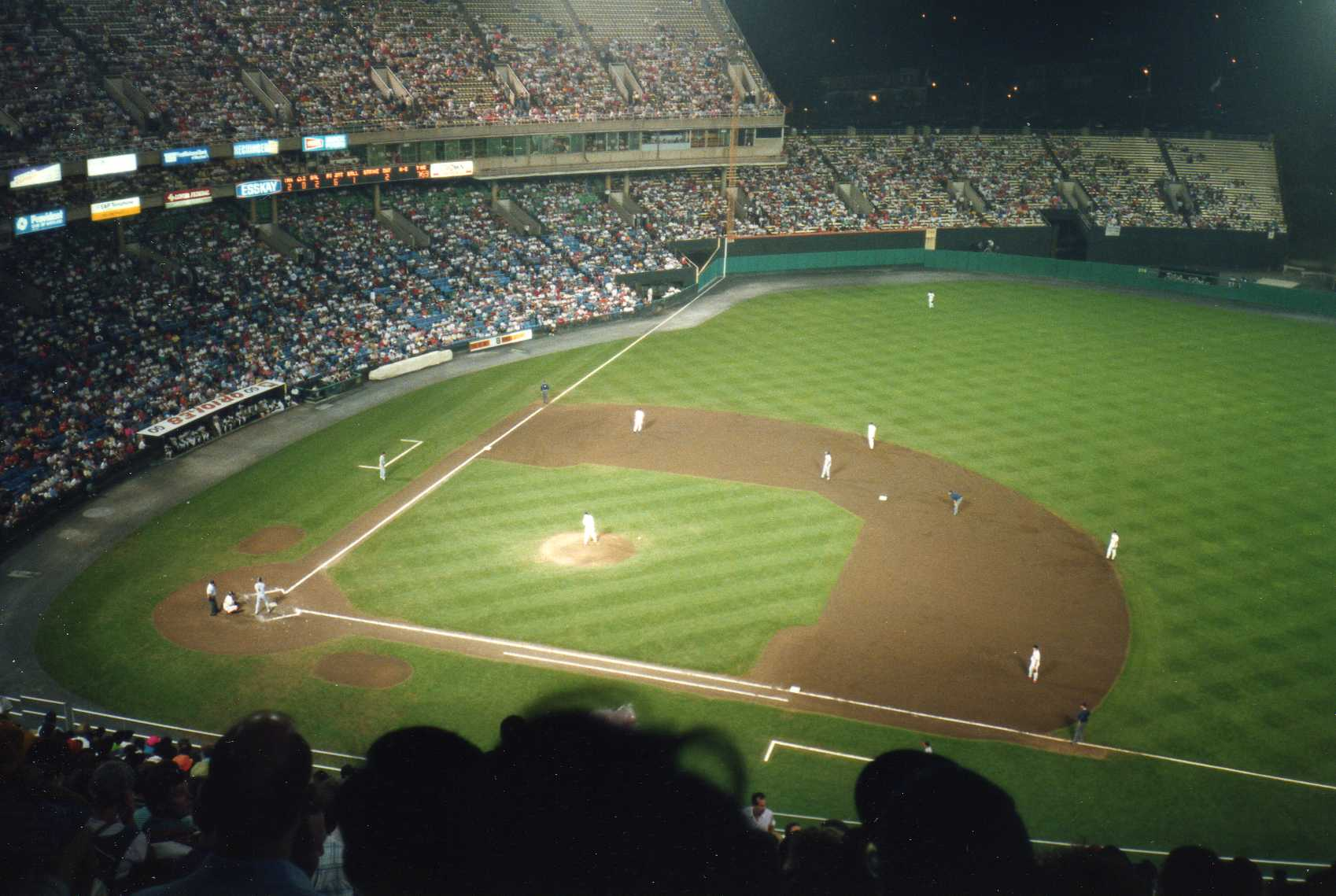
Memorial Stadium, Baltimore

The game was initially played at American League Park II. However, after the park's destruction in a fire in March 1911, it was played at the Griffith Stadium built on the same site in Northwest Washington, D.C. In 1962, it was moved to the new District Stadium (later renamed Robert F. Kennedy Stadium). It remained there until 1972 when the Washington Senators moved to Texas, becoming the Texas Rangers as RFK did not need a long-term baseball seating layout or field. It moved for the next two decades to the Memorial Stadium in Baltimore, Maryland, then to Langley High School in McLean, Virginia for 1977; and Four Mile Run Park in Alexandria, Virginia. From 1995 to 2004, the game was played in Prince George's Stadium in Bowie, Maryland. From 2005 to 2007, the event returned to RFK Stadium when the Montreal Expos moved to Washington to become the Washington Nationals. In 2008, Nationals Park was completed, and the Nationals moved there along with the Congressional Baseball Game.

In the late 1960s, a post-game reception for members of Congress and their staff was organized and sponsored by Sears, Roebuck and Company. However, attendance was meager until 1972 when Sears' Washington office Public Information Officer Larry Horist took over the management of the event and established the Most Valuable Player awards to be voted by each team and presented by the Speaker of the House and the Majority Leader of the Senate. He also obtained photos of the players in their hometown uniforms, producing baseball cards packaged in gum wrappers. A limited number of autographed master sheets of the cards occasionally appear for sale on Internet auction sites. The cards included such personalities as Senator Eugene McCarthy (D-MN), Barry Goldwater, Jr. (R-AZ), and professional player "Vinegar Bend" Mizell (R-NC). The cards were publicized in The Washington Post and became part of the permanent collection of the Baseball Hall of Fame.

== Rosters ==
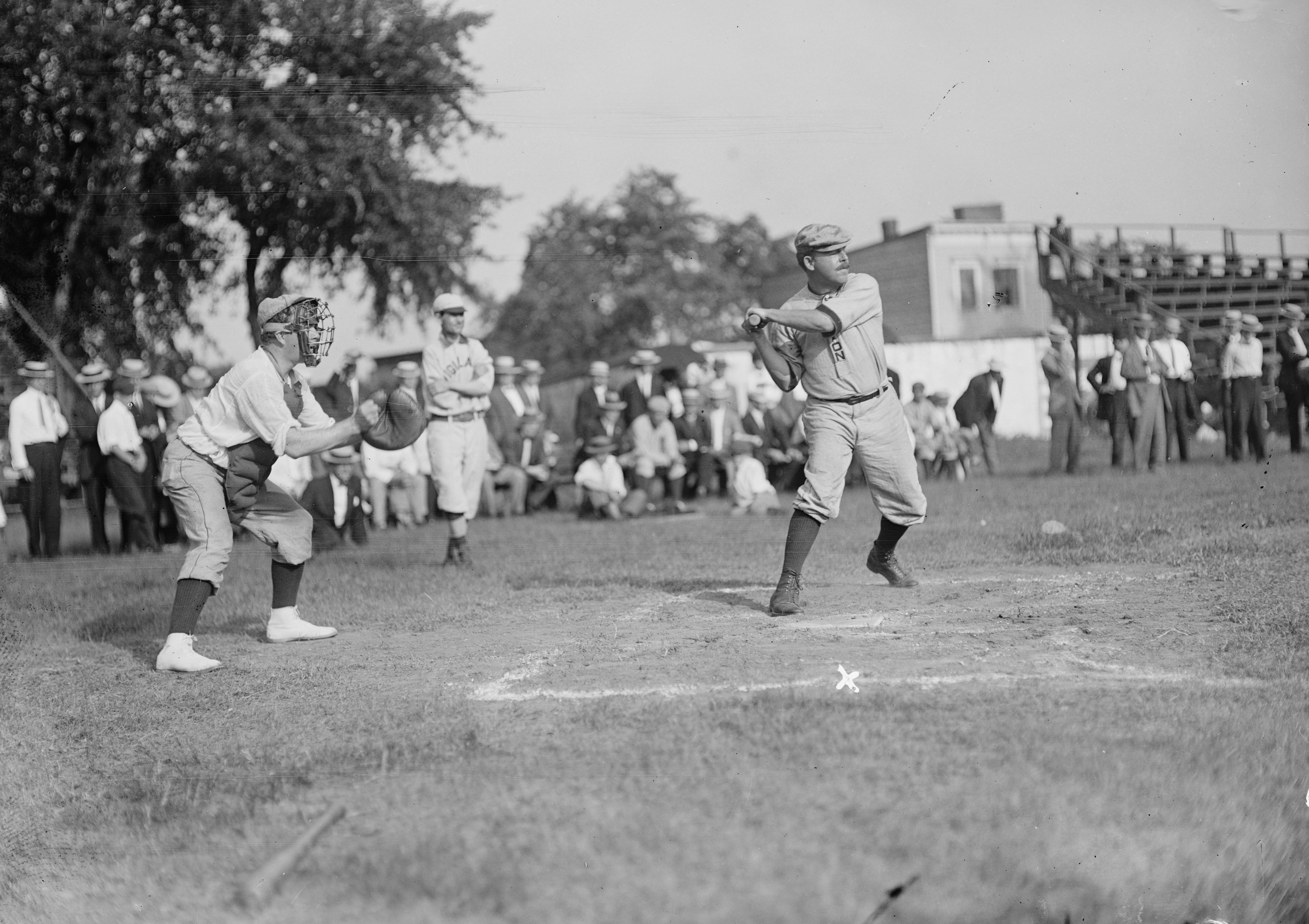
Nicholas Longworth at bat during the game, 1911

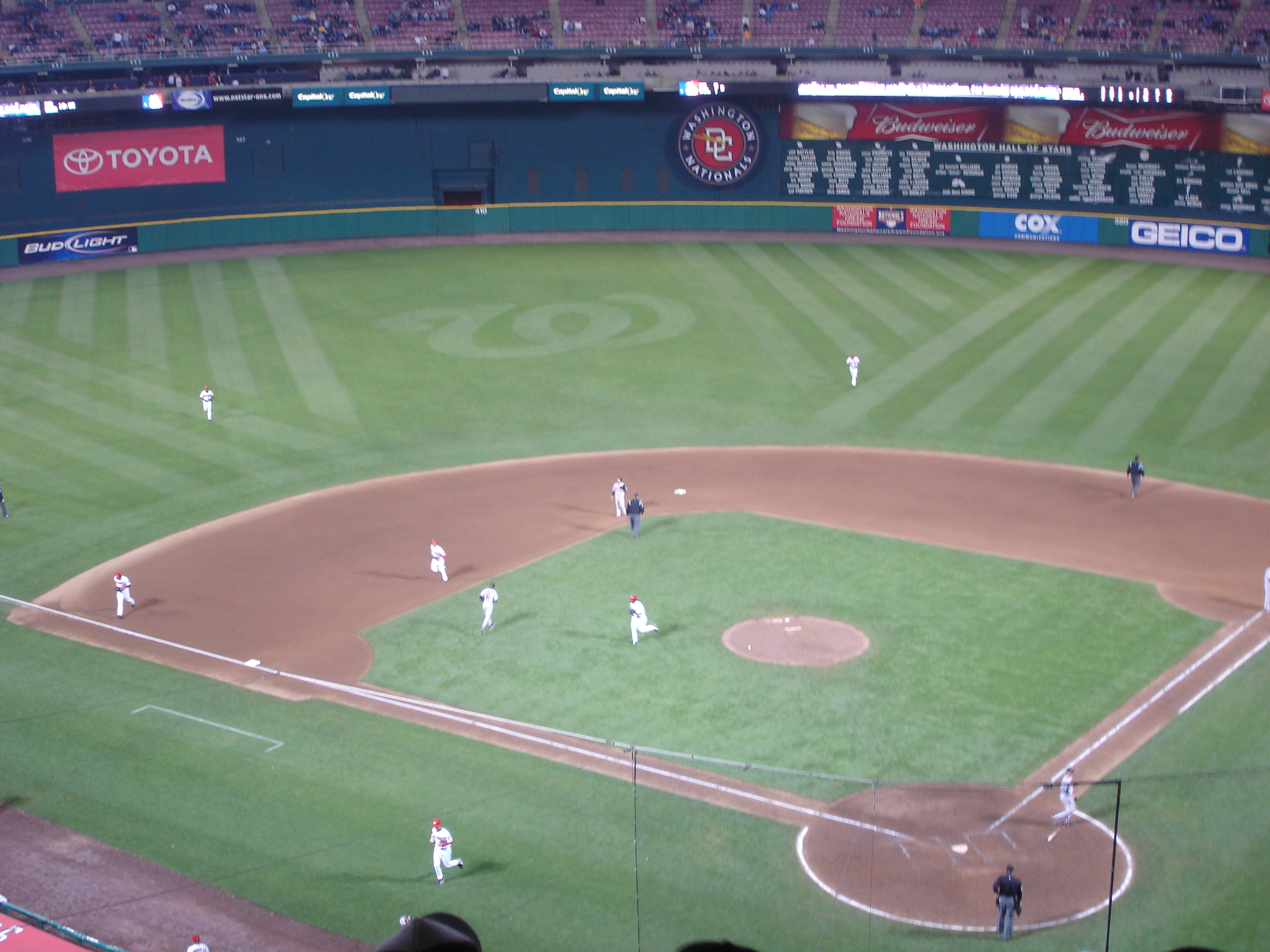
Robert F. Kennedy Memorial Stadium

While the modern Congressional Baseball Game comprises both House and Senate Members, this was not always the case. From 1909 to 1949, House Members exclusively filled the rosters—although there appears to have been no prohibition against Senators. Bicameral baseball was inaugurated in 1950, when Senator Harry P. Cain of Washington joined the Republican team and Senator-elect George Smathers of Florida, a former Representative, joined the Democratic team.

In a few cases, former professional baseball players were elected to Congress and impacted the game. In the case of Wilmer "Vinegar Bend" Mizell of North Carolina, a former professional pitcher, the Republican team was victorious for each year that he played. Fielding a once-a-year team presented some problems for members, who often grew rusty when it came to batting. Strong pitching proved decisive in most games but, in 1963, neither team could field a pitcher. As a result, relief pitcher George Susce of the Washington Senators pitched for both teams.

In 1917, Representative Jeannette Rankin of Montana was one of two scorekeepers at the game. More than 70 years later, in 1993, Representatives Ileana Ros-Lehtinen of Florida, Maria Cantwell of Washington, and Blanche Lincoln of Arkansas became the first women to break into the starting lineup.

In 1971, the first African Americans joined the game. Delegate Walter E. Fauntroy of the District of Columbia and Rep. Ron Dellums of California joined the Democratic roster. Despite Fauntroy's hitting prowess, the Democrats lost their eighth straight annual game, 7–3.

In 1909, Rep. Joseph F. O'Connell of Massachusetts hit the first home run, gaining three runs for the Democrats. In the same year, Republican representative Edward B. Vreeland of New York was the first player to be withdrawn due to an injury. In 1957, Rep. Gerald Ford of Michigan hit the first known grand slam, while playing for the Republicans. In 1979, Republican representative Ron Paul of Texas hit what is believed to be the first home run hit over the fence. Reps. John Shimkus of Illinois and Greg Steube of Florida are the only other players to hit out-of-the-park home runs, doing so in 1997 and 2021, respectively. Paul was inducted into the Congressional Baseball Hall of Fame before the 2012 game.

=== Hall of Fame ===
The Roll Call Congressional Baseball Hall of Fame was founded in 1993 and a brief description of each of the inductees through 2011 is available via the sponsor's website.

Year	Inductee	Notes
1993	John Tener	Organized the first Congressional Baseball Game
1993	Wilmer Mizell	
1993	William M. Wheeler	
1993	Ron Mottl	
1993	Silvio Conte	
1993	Robert H. Michel	
1993	Marty Russo	
1995	Dave McCurdy	
1996	Mike Synar	
1997	Bill Richardson	
1998	Sid Yudain	Founder of Roll Call
1999	Dan Schaefer	
2000	Carl Pursell	
2002	Steve Largent	
2003	David Bonior	
2004	Charlie Brotman	Helped Sid Yudain revive Congressional baseball in the 1960s
2006	Martin Sabo	
2007	Mike Oxley	
2008	Lou Frey	
2009	Kenny Hulshof	
2011	Mel Watt	
2012	Ron Paul	Hit first over-the-wall home run in 1979
2013	Zach Wamp	
2014	Bart Stupak	
2015	Skip Maraney	Pioneered Roll Call's sports coverage
2023	Mike Doyle	
2023	Kevin Brady	

In the early years of the game, each team wore a uniform that was either plain or had the words "Republicans" or "Democrats" embroidered on it. In modern games, members typically wear uniforms of the professional baseball teams or college baseball teams in their congressional district or home state. In the 1920s, pomp and fanfare preceded each game. The United States Navy Band and United States Marine Corps Band traditionally kicked off the festivities with patriotic tunes. In 1926, the Republicans paraded into American League Field on a live elephant, while in 1932, both teams had costumed mascots entertain the crowds. During the 1960s, the teams had cheerleaders dressed in uniforms.

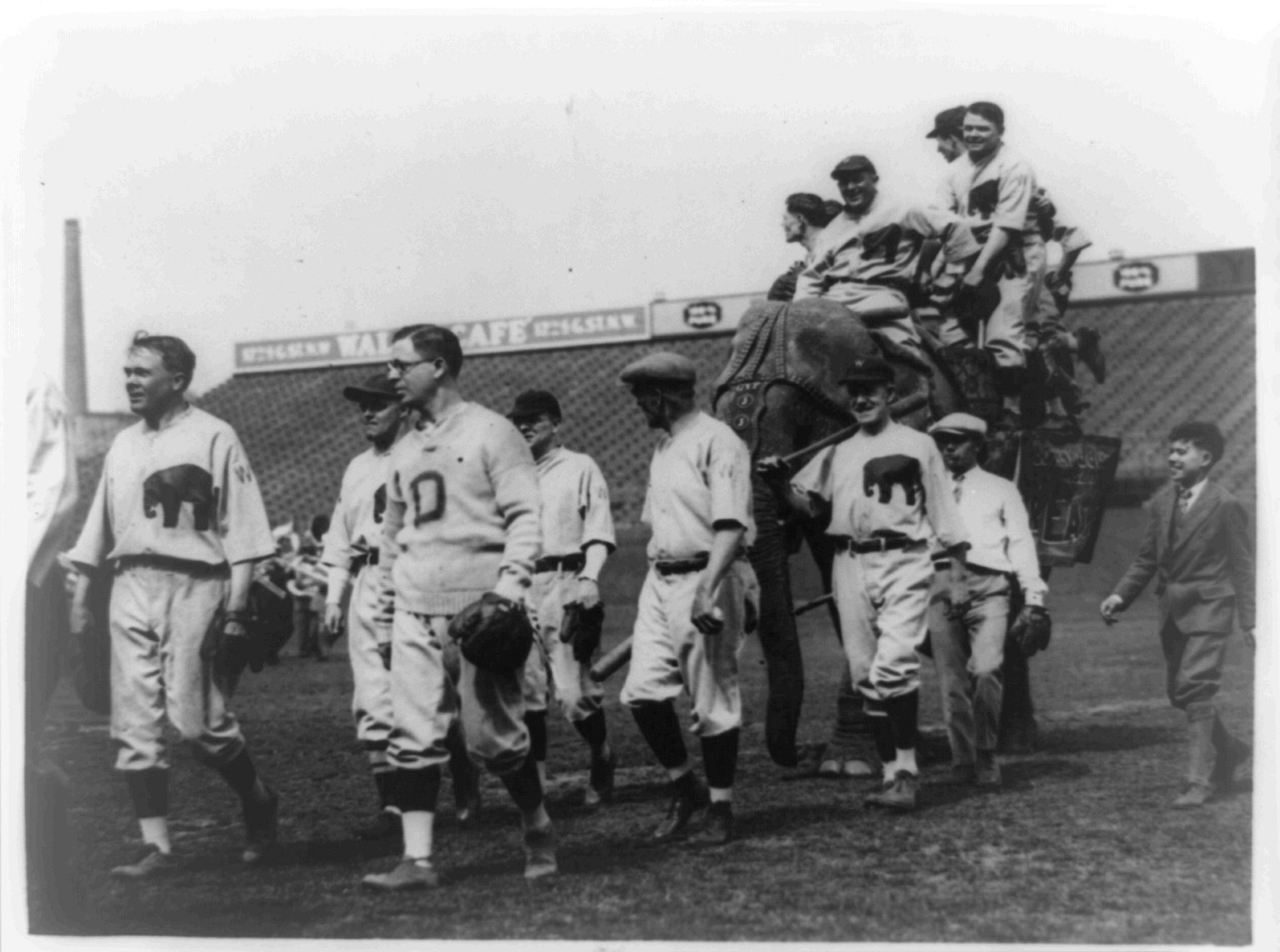
Members of the Republican team in 1926

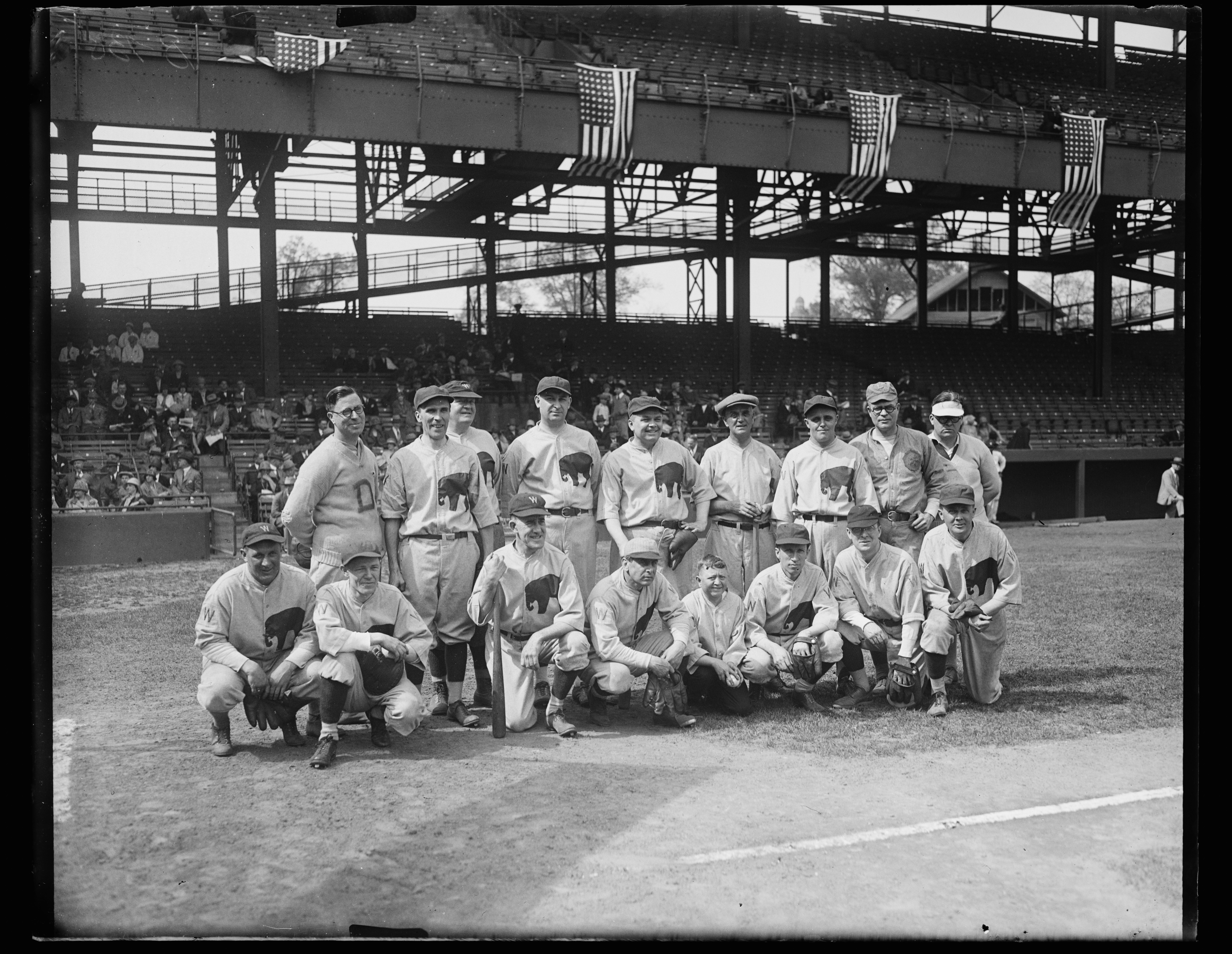
The Republican Team in the 1920s

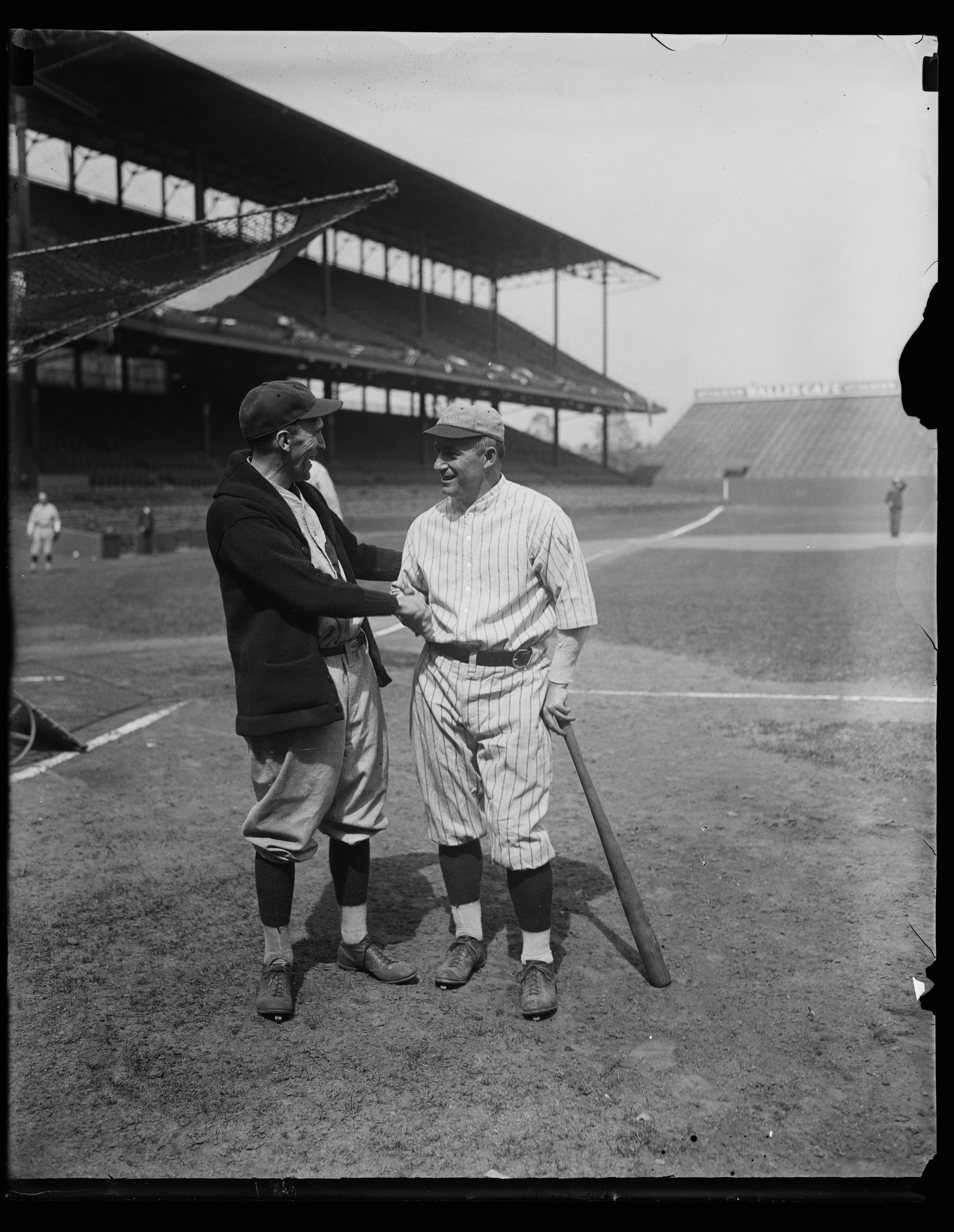
Representatives Clyde Kelly (left) and Thomas McMillan in the 1920s

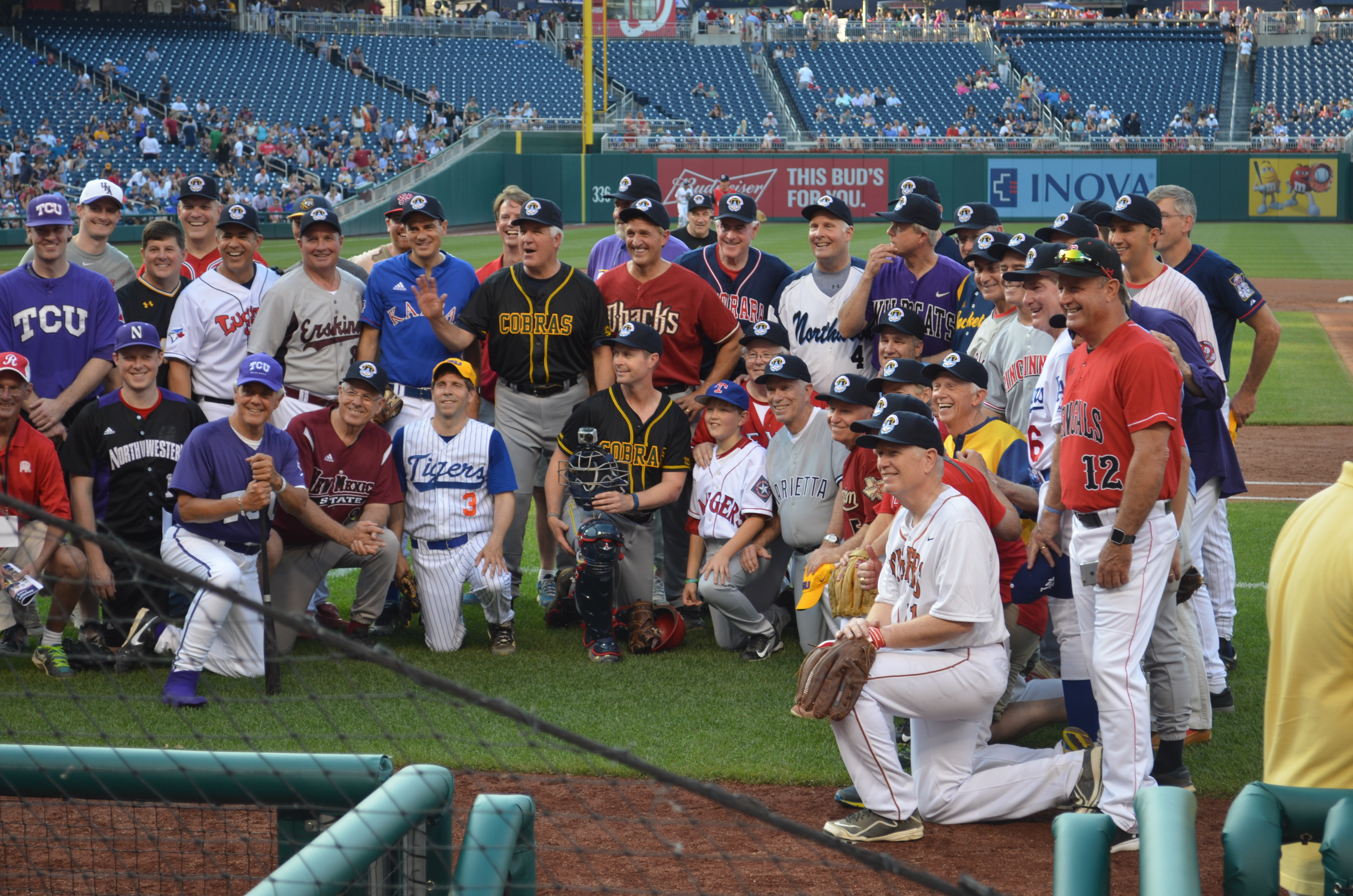
Participants in the 2017 game wearing various baseball jerseys

President Joe Biden at the 2021 Game

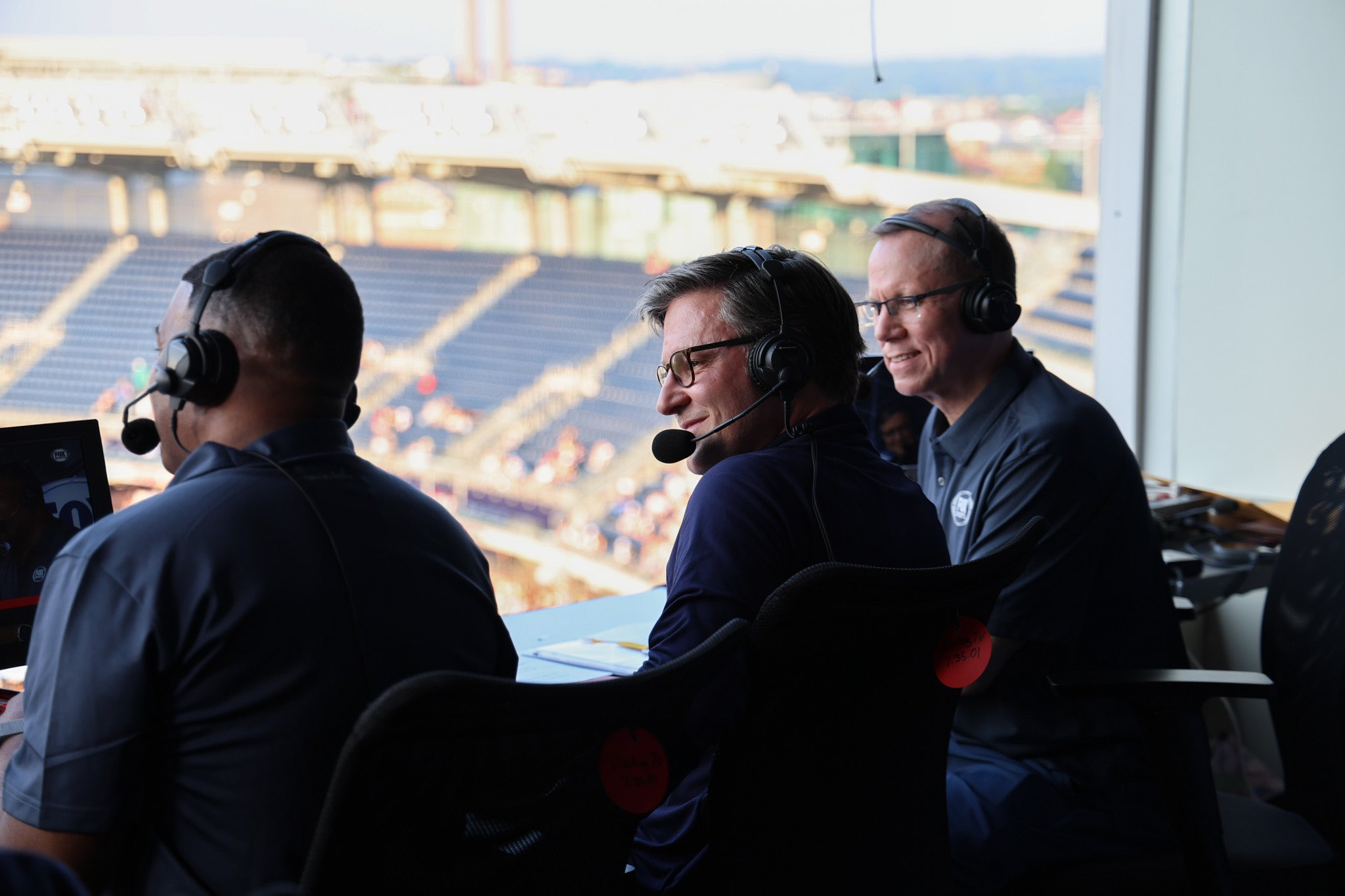
House Speaker Mike Johnson at the 2025 Game

== Game results ==
Through the 2026 game, Republicans lead the series, 48–42–1. The official website of the Congressional Baseball Game for Charity seemingly does not count three of those Republican wins because its History page listed (in 2017, but before the 2017 game) the series record as 39–39–1 (in a blue, red, white, and black bar near the bottom of the page). However, the same page states—in reference to the Roll Call Trophy—that "[t]o date, 10 of these coveted trophies have been awarded, eight to the Republicans and two to the Democrats." That statement indicates that the paragraphs of the History page were probably written after the 2002 game and before the 2005 game because the tenth trophy was awarded in 2002 and the eleventh trophy was awarded in 2005.

The Republicans won their 35th game in 2002 and then won seven more games after that (in 2003 to 2008, plus 2016). As of 2002, the Democrats had won 32 games; from 2003 to 2016, the Democrats won seven more games, for 39 wins (as of the 2016 game). Although the series record outlined in the bar near the bottom of the page includes the Democrats' seven wins between 2003 and 2016, the bar includes only four of the Republicans' seven wins during that same period. Scores, locations, and other details of past games are available here to the extent they are known. Democrats enjoyed consistent success throughout the 2010s as Congressman Cedric Richmond was the Democrats' reliable starting pitcher in addition to being the best hitter of the decade. The Republicans have won every game since Richmond's 2021 before-game retirement from Congress, including a 31–11 blowout in 2024, which saw the highest number of runs scored by a single team since 1928.

Year	Date	Location	Winner	Score	Notes
1909	July 16	American League Park II	Democrats	26–16	'Sunny Jim' Sherman was the umpire for the Republicans. As of July 11, it was not clear who the Democrats' umpire would be.
1910		No game	–	–	
1911	August 7	Georgetown Field	Democrats	12–9	Game ended in the fourth inning by unanimous consent. Most players were sore.
1912	June 22	National Park	Democrats	21–20	Scheduled for Saturday June 15, 1912, it was rescheduled to the following Saturday, June 22, 1912.
1913		National Park	Democrats	29–4	Game was called due to rain in the 4th inning. Members disputed whether it counted as a full game. Congressman Victor Murdock(R) umpired. Game benefiting the Washington Playground Association.
1914	August 1	National Park	Democrats	16–9	Originally scheduled for June 27, it was rescheduled to August 26, 1914, due to rain. In the end it was played on August 1, 1914. Congressman "Walt" Elder(D) of Louisiana lost his shoes and pitched in his socks.
1915		National Park	Democrats	–	
1916		National Park	Republicans	18–13	First Republican victory.
1917	June 30	National Park	Democrats	22–21	President Woodrow Wilson had to throw the first ball twice as Washington Senators manager Clark Griffith was unable to catch it. Suffragettes were in the stands but no banners were displayed. Sydney Mudd(R) of Maryland scored the only home-run of the game.
1918	June 9	National Park	Republicans	19–5	President Woodrow Wilson, Vice-President Thomas R. Marshall were present. The President tossed the first ball to Congressman James V. McClintic(D). Speaker Champ Clark was honorary umpire wearing a beaver hat of the seven-inning game. Sales of tickets and flowers were expected to bring in $1,200 for the Red Cross to provide bandages to the soldiers.
1919		National Park	Republicans	–	
1920–1925		No information	–	–	Newspaper accounts refer to the 1926 game as the first game in years.
1926		Griffith Stadium	Democrats	12–9	
1927		No game	–	–	
1928		Griffith Stadium	Democrats	36–4	Largest margin of victory in the Congressional Baseball Game.
1929		No game	–	–	
1930		No information	–	–	Newspaper accounts refer to the game during this period as "biennial."
1931		No game	–	–	
1932		Griffith Stadium	Republicans	19–5	The official score of this game is disputed. Umpire Tunney ruled a high fly ball hit in the last inning by Republicans an out instead of a home run.
1933		Griffith Stadium	Republicans	18–16	
1934–1944		No information	–	–	In lieu of a traditional Congressional Baseball Game, ballgames between members and the press were played in 1935, 1938, 1939, and 1941.
1945		Griffith Stadium	Democrats	–	
1946		Griffith Stadium	Democrats	–	
1947		Griffith Stadium	Republicans	16–13	
1948		Griffith Stadium	Democrats	23–14	
1949		Griffith Stadium	Democrats	16–10	
1950		Griffith Stadium	Democrats	8–4	
1951		Griffith Stadium	Democrats	7–3	
1952		Griffith Stadium	Democrats	6–3	
1953	June 5	Griffith Stadium	Democrats	3–2	
1954		Griffith Stadium	Democrats	2–1	
1955		Griffith Stadium	Republicans	12–4	
1956		Griffith Stadium	Republicans	8–7	
1957		Griffith Stadium	Democrats	10–9	
1958–1961		No game	–	–	
1962		D.C. Stadium	Republicans	4–0	
1963		D.C. Stadium	Democrats	11–0	
1964		D.C. Stadium	Republicans	6–5	
1965		D.C. Stadium	Republicans	3–1	Roll Call Trophy
1966		D.C. Stadium	Republicans	14–7	
1967		D.C. Stadium	Republicans	9–7	
1968		D.C. Stadium	Republicans	16–1	Roll Call Trophy
1969		RFK Stadium	Republicans	6–2	
1970		RFK Stadium	Republicans	6–4	
1971		RFK Stadium	Republicans	7–3	Roll Call Trophy
1972		RFK Stadium	Republicans	7–2	
1973	July 30	Memorial Stadium	Republicans	12–4	
1974		Memorial Stadium	Republicans	7–3	Roll Call Trophy
1975		Memorial Stadium	Democrats	3–2	
1976		Memorial Stadium	Democrats	5–4	
1977		Langley High School, McLean, Virginia	Republicans	7–6	A rainout forced the game to an alternative field.
1978		Four Mile Run Park	Republicans	4–3	
1979		Four Mile Run Park	Democrats	7–3	Roll Call Trophy
1980		Four Mile Run Park	Democrats	21–9	
1981		Four Mile Run Park	Republicans	6–4	
1982		Four Mile Run Park	Democrats	7–5	Video of the entire 1982 game, C-SPAN
1983		Four Mile Run Park	Tied	17–17	Called after 9 innings. Video of the entire 1983 game, C-SPAN
1984		Four Mile Run Park	Republicans	13–4	
1985		Four Mile Run Park	Republicans	9–3	Roll Call Trophy
1986		Four Mile Run Park	Democrats	8–6	
1987		Four Mile Run Park	Democrats	15–14	
1988		Four Mile Run Park	Republicans	14–13	
1989		Four Mile Run Park	Republicans	8–2	
1990		Four Mile Run Park	Republicans	9–6	Roll Call Trophy
1991		Four Mile Run Park	Democrats	13–9	
1992		Four Mile Run Park	Republicans	11–7	
1993		Four Mile Run Park	Democrats	13–1	
1994		Four Mile Run Park	Democrats	9–2	Roll Call Trophy; Rep. Mike Oxley (R-OH) broke his arm when colliding with Rep. Sherrod Brown (D-OH) at first base. Highlights of the 1994 game, C-SPAN
1995	August 1	Prince George's Stadium	Republicans	6–0	Highlights of the 1995 game, C-SPAN
1996		Prince George's Stadium	Democrats	16–14	
1997		Prince George's Stadium	Republicans	10–9	
1998		Prince George's Stadium	Republicans	4–1	Roll Call Trophy
1999		Prince George's Stadium	Republicans	17–1	
2000		Prince George's Stadium	Democrats	13–8	
2001		Prince George's Stadium	Republicans	9–1	
2002		Prince George's Stadium	Republicans	9–2	Roll Call Trophy
2003		Prince George's Stadium	Republicans	5–3	
2004		Prince George's Stadium	Republicans	14–7	
2005		RFK Stadium	Republicans	19–10	Roll Call Trophy
2006		RFK Stadium	Republicans	12–1	
2007		RFK Stadium	Republicans	5–2	
2008		Nationals Park	Republicans	11–10	Roll Call Trophy
2009		Nationals Park	Democrats	15–10	
2010	June 29	Nationals Park	Democrats	13–5	
2011	July 14	Nationals Park	Democrats	8–2	Roll Call Trophy
2012	June 28	Nationals Park	Democrats	18–5	
2013	June 14	Nationals Park	Democrats	22–0	
2014	June 25	Nationals Park	Democrats	15–6	Roll Call Trophy
2015	June 11	Nationals Park	Democrats	5–2	Interview with team managers Joe Barton (R-TX) and Mike Doyle (D-PA) about the tradition of the Congressional Baseball Game, Washington Journal, C-SPAN President Obama attended
2016	June 23	Nationals Park	Republicans	8–7	Roll Call Trophy retired in 2016
2017	June 15	Nationals Park	Democrats	11–2	Shooting occurred at Republican practice on June 14; Video of the entire game
2018	June 14	Nationals Park	Democrats	21–5	House Majority Whip Steve Scalise (R-LA) returned to the field after being critically injured from a gunshot at a practice in 2017. Video of the entire game
2019	June 26	Nationals Park	Democrats	14–7	Video of the entire game
2020		No game	–	–	Game canceled due to the COVID-19 pandemic
2021	September 29	Nationals Park	Republicans	13–12	Video of the entire game; President Biden attended
2022	July 28	Nationals Park	Republicans	10–0	Video of the entire game
2023	June 14	Nationals Park	Republicans	16–6	Video of the entire game
2024	June 12	Nationals Park	Republicans	31–11	Eight protesters aligned with Climate Defiance arrested after storming the field during game Video of the entire game
2025	June 11	Nationals Park	Republicans	13–2	Video of the entire game
2026	June 10	Nationals Park	Republicans	11–2	Video of the entire game

== See also ==
- Congressional Soccer Match
