= Baltimore Memorial Stadium =

Former sports stadium in Baltimore

- "The World's Largest Outdoor Insane Asylum"
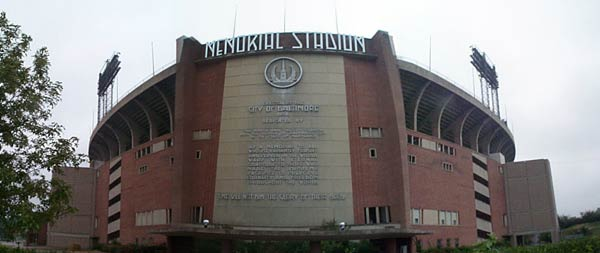
- Memorial Stadium in September 2000
- Interactive map of Baltimore Memorial Stadium
- Address: 900 East 33rd Street
- Location: Baltimore, Maryland
- Coordinates: 39°19′46″N 76°36′5″W
- Owner: City of Baltimore
- Operator: Maryland Stadium Authority
- Capacity: 31,000 (1950); 47,855 (1953); 53,371 (1991)
- Surface: Grass
- Field size: Left Field – 309 ft Left-Center – 446 ft (1954), 378 ft (1990); Center Field – 445 ft (1954), 405 ft (1980); Right-Center – 446 ft (1954), 378 ft (1990); Right Field – 309 ft

Construction
- Groundbreaking: 1921 (first version); 1949 (second version)
- Opened: December 2, 1922 (first version); April 20, 1950 (second version)
- Closed: December 14, 1997
- Demolished: April 2001–February 15, 2002
- Cost: US$6.5 million ($87 million in 2025 dollars)
- Architects: Hall, Border, and Donaldson
- Structural engineers: R. E. L. Williams (building construction), Faisant and Kooken (consulting)
- General contractors: DeLucca-Davis & Carozza/Joseph F. Hughes

Tenants
- Baseball Baltimore Orioles (IL) mid-season 1944–1953; Baltimore Elite Giants (Negro Leagues) 1950; Baltimore Orioles (MLB) 1954–1991; Bowie Baysox (EL) 1993 Football Baltimore Colts (AAFC / NFL) 1947–1950; Baltimore Colts (NFL) 1953–1983; Baltimore Stallions (CFL) 1994–1995; Baltimore Ravens (NFL) 1996–1997 Soccer Baltimore Bays (NPSL / NASL) 1967–1968; Baltimore Comets (NASL) 1974–1975

Baltimore Memorial Stadium was a multi-purpose stadium in Baltimore, Maryland, United States, that formerly stood on 33rd Street on an oversized block officially called Venable Park, a former city park from the 1920s. The site was bound by Ellerslie Avenue to the west, 36th Street to the north, and Ednor Road to the east.

Two stadiums were located here — a 1922 version known primarily as Baltimore Stadium or Municipal Stadium; and a rebuilt, double-deck, multi-sport stadium, completed in mid-1954, and rechristened Baltimore Memorial Stadium — Memorial Stadium for short.

== History ==
=== Construction of the football stadium ===
Municipal Stadium/Baltimore Stadium with the old Greco–Roman style colonnade and porticoes and 33rd Street boulevard to the south in the foreground – Army–Navy football game in 1944

Memorial Stadium was launched as Municipal Stadium, also sometimes known as Baltimore Stadium or Venable Stadium. Designed by Pleasants Pennington and Albert W. Lewis, it was built in 1922 over a six-month period at the urging of the Mayor, William F. Broening in a previously undeveloped area just north beyond the city's iconic rows of rowhouses. The stadium was constructed in what was formerly Venable Park and was operated by the city's Board of Park Commissioners.

It was primarily a football stadium, a large horseshoe with an earthen-mound exterior and its open end with a large stone gateway of a Greek/Roman colonnade and porticoes on the open-faced south side facing the new 33rd Street boulevard/parkway which had just recently been cut through east to west. In this configuration, it seated anywhere from 70,000 to 80,000 people.

In its early years it hosted various public and private high school and college-level games, including the annual "Poly-City Game" on Thanksgiving Day where the "Collegians" (later known as the "Black Knights") of Baltimore City College opposed its rival Baltimore Polytechnic Institute "Engineers" (1889), along with the Roman Catholic high schools' "Loyola-Calvert Hall Game" pitting the Cardinals of Calvert Hall College against Loyola High School at Blakefield's Dons.

Home games for the University of Maryland at College Park's Terrapins football and the United States Naval Academy Midshipmen were sometimes held at the stadium, attracting a national audience and media coverage.

=== Baseball park ===
In July 1944, Municipal Stadium was pressed into service as a baseball park by the Baltimore Orioles of the International League, when their previous home, "Oriole Park," located in the Abell neighborhood to the southwest, was destroyed by fire.

The minor league Orioles went on to win the International League championship and the Junior World Series that year. The large post-season crowds in attendance at Municipal Stadium, which would not have been possible at Oriole Park, even surpassing the attendance of Major League Baseball's 1944 World Series, caught the attention of professional team owners, and Baltimore suddenly became regarded as a viable option for teams looking to relocate.

Babe Ruth's widow, Claire, at the unveiling of a memorial plaque to his memory in Memorial Stadium (1955)

Further momentum for sports in Baltimore was spurred when the failing Miami Seahawks franchise of the fledgling All-America Football Conference (AAFC) was relaunched in the fall of 1947 as the Baltimore Colts.

The presence of professional football and the prospect of professional baseball spurred the city to rebuild Municipal Stadium into a facility of "major league caliber." This reconstructed stadium was to be renamed Baltimore Memorial Stadium in honor of the thousands of the city's dead of the recently concluded World War II. Baltimore mayor Thomas D'Alesandro Jr. championed the new stadium project and overcame various legal and political hurdles which delayed progress on the project.

The initial plan called for a single, horseshoe-shaped deck to be built, with the open end facing north, and was designed to host football as well as baseball. It was engineered with enough strength to eventually support a second deck and a roof.

The lower deck reconstruction began in the spring/early summer of 1949 and was done in stages, first at the previously open south end of the stadium, and slowly obliterating the old Municipal Stadium stands, even as the International League Orioles continued playing on their makeshift diamond, along with the new Baltimore Colts of the former All-America Football Conference merged with the reorganized National Football League.

The old seating at the north end was retained for the pro and college football seasons that fall. By year's end, the horseshoe was sufficiently completed to allow the baseball infield to be relocated from the northwest corner of the field to the south end, and the Orioles opened the 1950 season at the newly oriented diamond. Construction continued on the single deck, until finally all the remnants of the old stadium were gone. The new facility could seat around 31,000.

During the 1950 season, the Baltimore Elite Giants of the Negro American League hosted four games at the venue, including their season opener on May 12, a 4-3 victory over the Philadelphia Stars in front of more than 10,000 fans.

=== Second deck ===
The first Baltimore Colts franchise terminated operations for financial reasons at the end of the 1950 season. Community support for a second NFL franchise remained strong, however, and late in 1952 a group of Baltimore businessmen pooled their resources in a bid to win a new league franchise. A "Bring Back the Colts" drive launched in December 1952 generated the presale of 15,000 season tickets in just six weeks. The campaign made an impression and Baltimore, then the sixth largest city in the United States, was awarded an expansion team for the 1953 NFL season.

With the NFL back and realistic rumors simultaneously circulating of the arrival of major league baseball, the second deck construction was begun during the summer of 1953. First, two groups of sections were built facing the 50 yard line. Then they were extended toward the south end, completing the upper deck horseshoe. Additional plans to fully enclose the stadium and add a roof to the upper tier were never implemented, although an extra upper deck section would be added on each side in 1964.

Work accelerated in November 1953 when the St. Louis Browns of the American League were announced to be moving to Baltimore to become the new major league version of the Baltimore Orioles, to begin play in April 1954, the city's first major league franchise in over 50 years (not counting the Federal League experiment). The total cost of the multi-phase project was $6.5 million.

The expanded stadium was still under construction as of baseball's opening day in 1954, with the new entrance plaza and the new outfield lighting not yet finished. Work was finally completed at the start of the summer.

On April 15, 1954, thousands of Baltimoreans jammed city streets as the new Orioles paraded from downtown at the Baltimore City Hall to Memorial Stadium for their first home game. During the 90-minute parade, the new "Birds" signed autographs, handed out pictures and threw styrofoam balls to the crowd as the throngs marched down several major city streets ending on East 33rd Street. Inside, more than 46,000 watched the Orioles beat the Chicago White Sox, 3–1, to win their home opener and move into first place (although temporarily) in the American League.

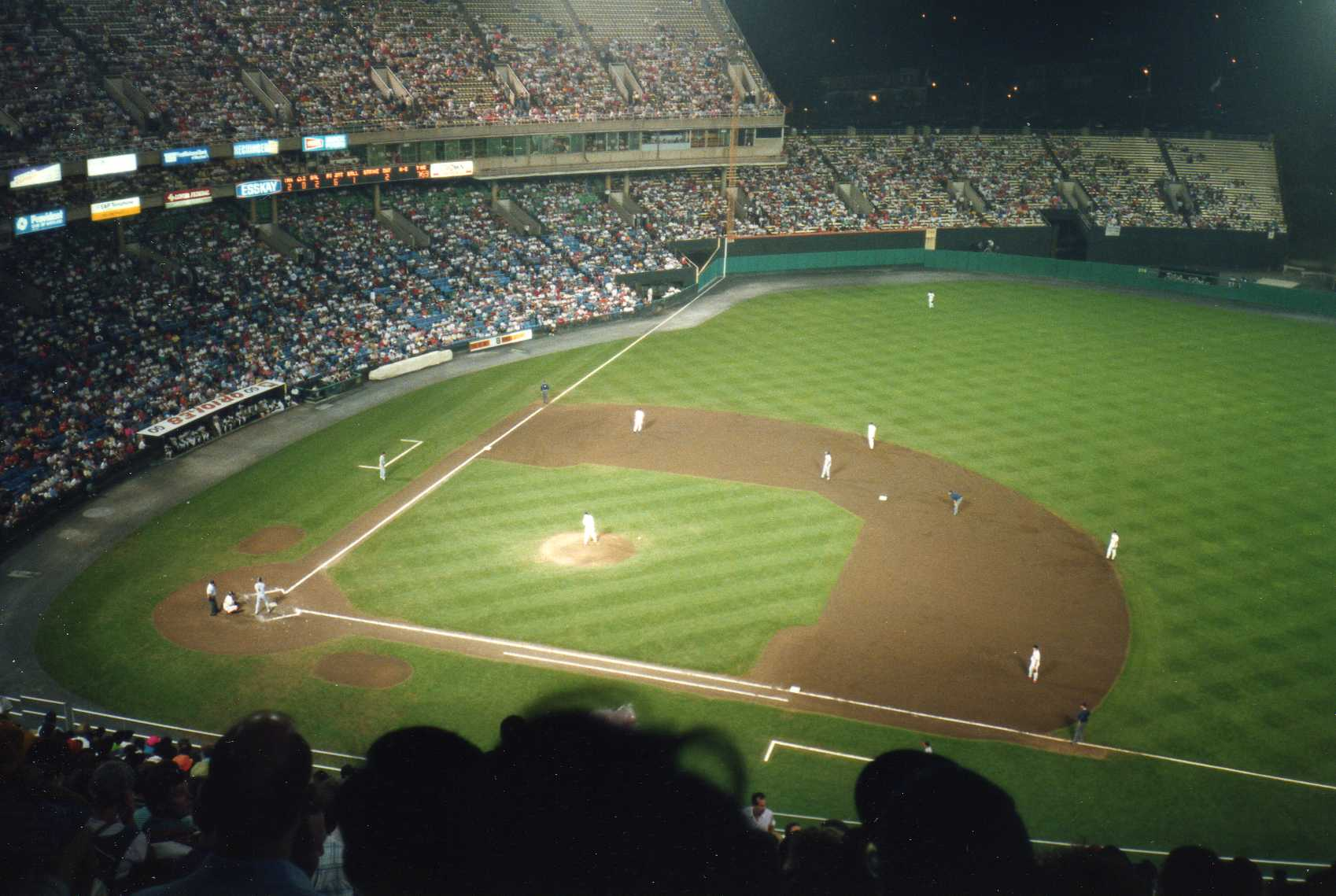
The Orioles playing one of the last major league home night games at the stadium, September 14, 1991

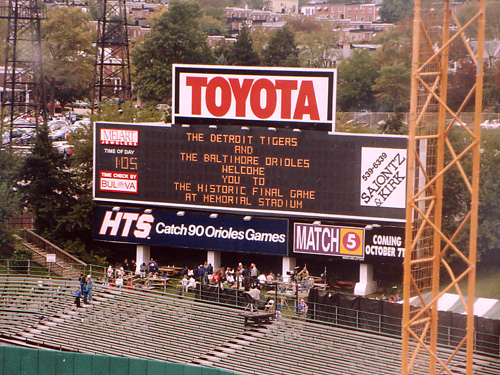
Scoreboard before the final Orioles home game, October 6, 1991

Both the new Orioles and the Colts had some success over coming years, during the late 1950s and throughout the decade of the 1960s. The Colts sold out 56 consecutive games at Memorial Stadium during their peak years of popularity in Baltimore. Both Colt and Oriole fans were so wildly devoted to their teams, with as many as 60,000 Colts during the consecutive games streak, that the stadium was dubbed "The Worlds's Largest Outdoor Insane Asylum."

=== Abandonment ===
The dual-use stadium was not without its critics, however. Traffic and a parking shortage made accessing the stadium difficult. Concrete poles blocked views, and unsheltered areas grew hot in the summer. Most of the seats were bench-style, with few having chair backs — let alone more modern amenities.

The NFL's Baltimore Colts were the first to express deep dissatisfaction and to seek a new venue. In addition to sub-optimal conditions at Memorial Stadium, capacity was a concern, with the Colts selling out every home game from the start of the 1964 season to the end of 1970 and unable to meet demand for season tickets.

In 1970, Colts owner Carroll Rosenbloom announced that he was seeking a 500-acre parcel in one of three suburban Baltimore counties for construction of a new stadium. A new $20 million football-only facility was planned, with Rosenbloom adamant that the team would be leaving Memorial Stadium expeditiously due to unhappiness with stadium conditions and ongoing irritation over a September legal dispute with the city over whether a Monday Night Football game could be hosted at the site — a dispute which Rosenbloom characterized as "the end of the road."

No stadium deal was ever completed by Rosenbloom.

On July 13, 1972, businessman Robert Irsay made a last-minute bid of $19 million to purchase the Los Angeles Rams from the estate of Dan Reeves. He immediately swapped franchises with Colts owner Rosenbloom, becoming the controlling partner of the Baltimore franchise that same day. Rosenbloom's stadium problem became Irsay's stadium problem, with the former becoming the new tenant of the capacious Los Angeles Memorial Coliseum.

Memorial Stadium's limitations remained and its amenities continued to deteriorate over time. A decade passed and still neither Irsay nor the city could agree to desperately-needed improvements to the aging and tattered stadium. Irsay began to visit other cities, moving various civic leaders to put together stadium packages that would provide a better financial and physical situation for the Colts. Indianapolis was chosen.

In the middle of a snowy night on March 29, 1984, under threat of a measure introduced into the state legislature to initiate condemnation proceedings for the city and state assert eminent domain and take ownership of the Colts franchise, moving vans rolled in and the Colts rolled out for their new Indiana home.

Loss of the Colts left the Orioles as Memorial Stadium's sole major league tenant and dramatically increased the level of urgency of the political establishment regarding necessary stadium upgrades.

=== Community reaction ===
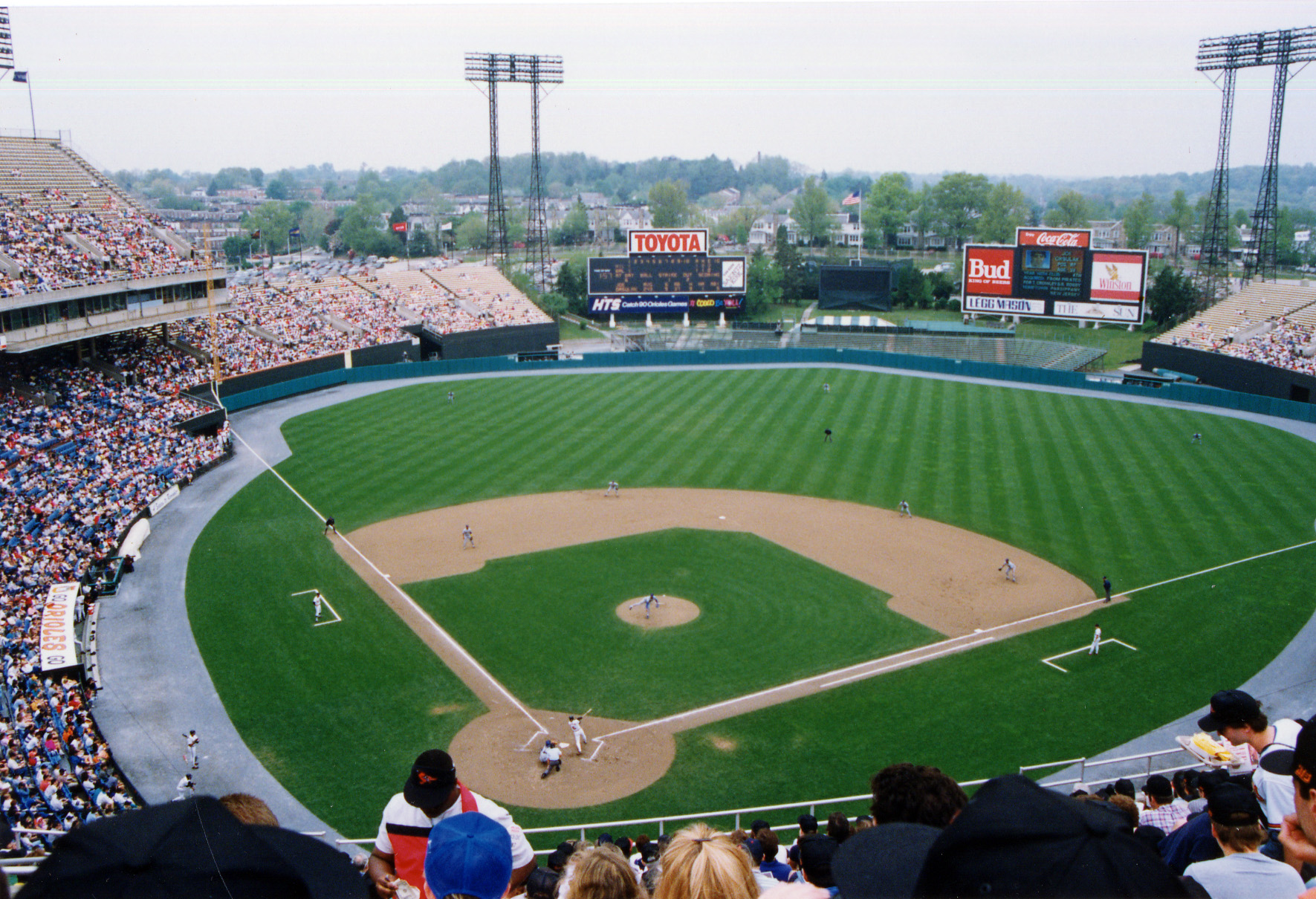
The residential neighborhood of Ednor Gardens-Lakeside surrounding Memorial Stadium to the north was visible just beyond the outfield, pictured here in 1991

When the decision to abandon Memorial Stadium (in favor of the new downtown ballpark) became imminent, various citizen groups began to organize opposition to the decision. In particular, the neighborhoods surrounding Memorial Stadium became anxious about the impact on their area of an abandoned "white elephant": there simply wasn't any other use that would generate the funds to properly maintain the site, and there were no funds for demolition and redevelopment. While the stadium events may have created periodic disruptions to local life, it did provide easy access to major league sports and special attention from the city for maintenance of the area.

The mayor and other power brokers knew of strong general public opposition to subsidizing a new ballpark. City-wide and local community leaders also knew of this potential, but there was also a shortage of leaders willing to take on this task (although this was never stated, and may not have been known by Mayor Schaefer). During this pivotal period, local community leaders decided to "bargain away the petition drive" for certain considerations. To do this, area community groups formed the "Stadium Neighborhoods Coalition" (SNC) and negotiated the following: (1) Establishment of an official Memorial Redevelopment Stadium Task Force with public meetings and minutes; and, (2) a written pledge by then Mayor Schaefer to provide upfront funding for any demolition and redevelopment resulting from this community process.

The Orioles played their final game at the stadium on October 6, 1991, which ended in a defeat at the hands of the Detroit Tigers, 7–1; a postgame ceremony was held with 78 past Oriole players meeting, and ended with home plate being removed by the grounds crew and placed in a stretch limousine. It was sent across town to Camden Yards under police escort where it would be placed at the new stadium minutes later.

For the next decade, while the community input process lumbered on, Memorial Stadium hosted a minor league baseball team and two new professional football teams. The Bowie Baysox, a minor league affiliate of the Orioles, played their inaugural 1993 season at Memorial Stadium while their permanent home ballpark was being built. As the Orioles were then in their second season at Camden Yards, this gave Baltimore the rare distinction of hosting both major league and minor league teams simultaneously; currently, New York City has that honor with the presence of the Brooklyn Cyclones, who are affiliated with the Mets.

The Baltimore Stallions played during the Canadian Football League's "southern expansion" experiment to the United States for two seasons in 1994 and 1995. The team was originally known as the "Baltimore CFL Colts", but they were forced to change their name to the Stallions (after one year of playing without an official name) when the NFL was granted a legal court injunction which prevented the CFL franchise from reclaiming the "Colts" name. Owner Jim Speros took over the facility, exchanging tickets to contractors for renovations to help bring the dilapidated stadium to workable condition. Memorial Stadium was unique in that it was one of the few U. S. stadiums that could accommodate the full 65-yard width and 150-yard length of a regulation Canadian football field (most likely since it had been designed for baseball as well as American football). They had winning records in each of the 1994 and 1995 seasons, and in both years advanced to the championship game. Averaging more than 30,000 spectators a game for two years, the Stallions would eventually become the only American team to win the Grey Cup in 1995.

The CFL Stallions were ultimately forced out of town when Cleveland Browns owner Art Modell announced he was moving his team to Baltimore. Following protracted negotiations between Modell, the two cities and the NFL, it was decided that Modell would be allowed to take his players and organization to Baltimore as the Ravens, while leaving the Browns name and legacy for a replacement team that returned in 1999. The Ravens were tenants of the stadium until the end of the 1997 NFL regular season, when they moved to what is now M&T Bank Stadium. It was bid farewell in style by both the Orioles (in a field-encircling ceremony staged by many former Oriole players and hosted by Hall of Fame announcer Ernie Harwell, who began his announcing career here) and the Ravens (who had many former Colts assemble for a final play, run by Unitas. The play had Unitas hand the ball off to Lydell Mitchell, who then handed the ball to Lenny Moore in a reverse and Moore ran in for a touchdown).

Through all of this, the official Redevelopment Task Force met off and on, deliberating on prospects for long-term use. The community remained quite sensitized about any inappropriate use of this center-of-the-neighborhood structure. When word leaked that the stadium was being considered for staging rock concerts, a group of neighbors organized the group "People Against Concerts at Memorial Stadium" (PACAMS). As Baltimore was deciding to confirm or deny this story—with no immediate answer—a large public opposition developed. With the resulting outpouring of anger, the City publicly confirmed its decision not to lease the site for rock concerts.

In resolving the rock concert problem, a new spirit of proactive advocacy was ignited in the community. In fact, there had been developing a division within established neighborhood groups about the best tactics in securing a good future for the stadium. Should the groups make further use of the direct action tactics of PACAMS, or use quiet lobbying by established groups?

That division was never resolved, as individuals continued to work in different paths. In fact, PACAMS, after its success in preventing the stadium's use for concerts, reconstituted itself as "People Advocating a Community Agenda for Memorial Stadium"—continuing with the successful PACAMS acronym. With PACAMS' public advocacy, and the established groups' holding fast to more traditional lines of community, there ultimately resulted in a large, and well attended, public meeting where several redevelopment proposals were presented. The resulting community preference for a mixed used development led to the successful development now on site.

=== Demolition and redevelopment ===
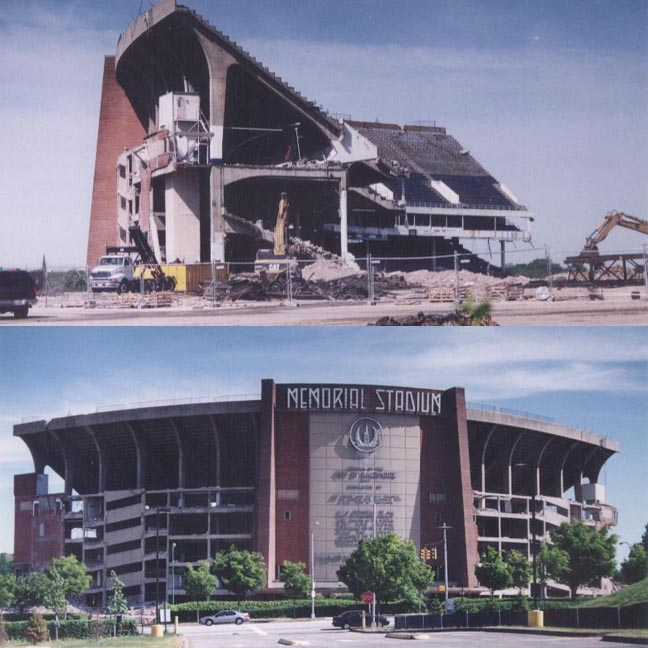
Demolition of stadium, summer 2001

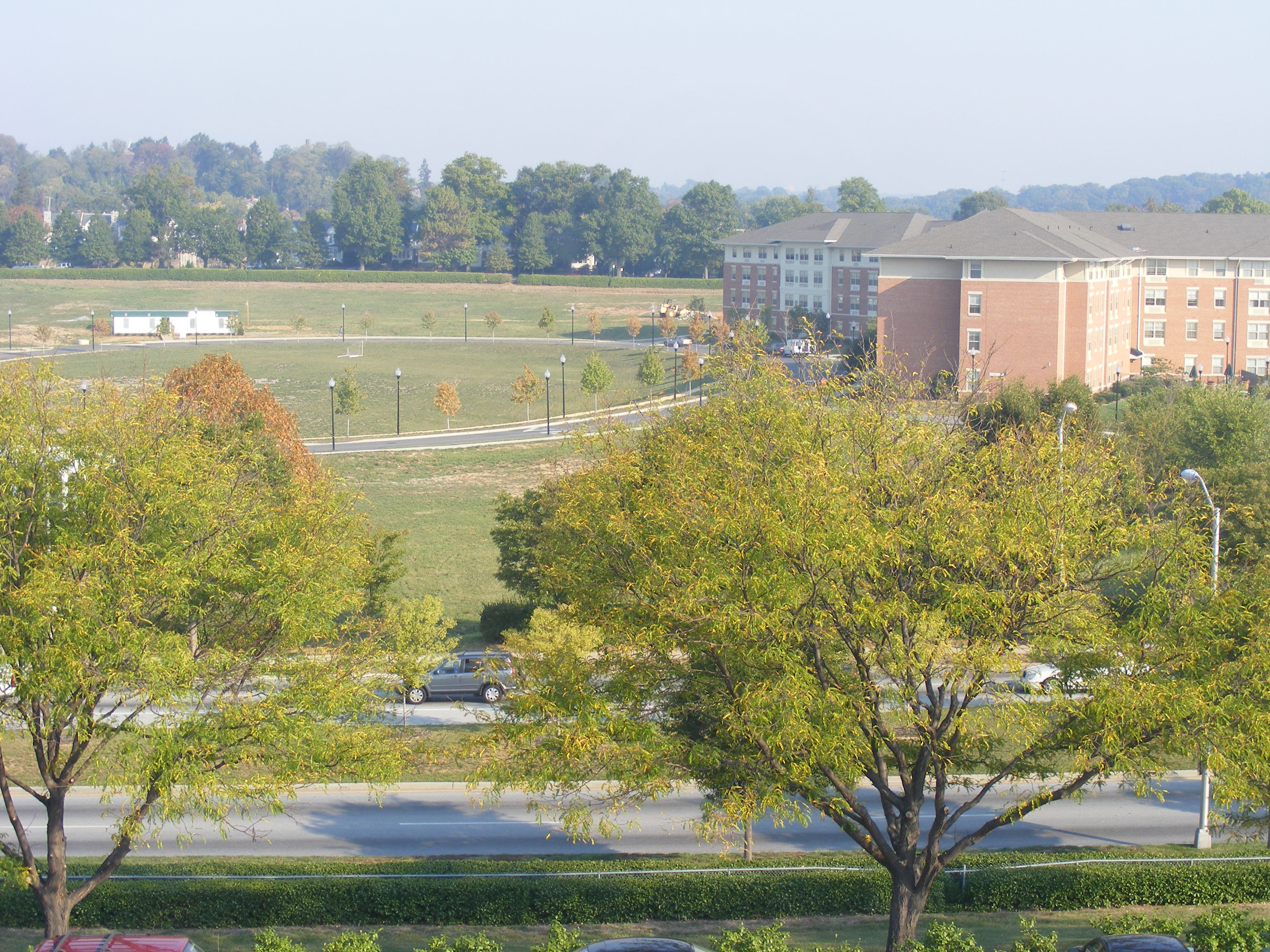
2007 Seniors apartment complex now standing in what used to be right field

The City of Baltimore solicited proposals for development of the site. Most proposals preserved some or all of the stadium, including the memorial to World War II veterans and words on the facade. One proposal even had a school occupying the former offices of Memorial Stadium and the field used as a recreational facility for the school. Mayor Martin J. O'Malley, however, favored the proposal that resulted in the total razing of the stadium, an act that many fought and protested. Former mayor and governor William Donald Schaefer protested that the stadium was razed for political reasons. The venerable and historic stadium was demolished over a 10-month period beginning in April 2001. Approximately 10,000 cubic yards (7,600 m^{3}) of concrete rubble from it was used to build an artificial reef over a 6-acre (2.4 ha) site in the Chesapeake Bay 3 miles (4.8 km) west of Tolchester Beach in 2002.

As of 2005, the former site of Memorial Stadium housed Maryland's largest YMCA facility and the developing vision of "Stadium Place", a mixed income community for seniors in Baltimore City. Currently there are four senior apartment complexes up and running on site. All of this, the political wranglings, the sports history and the city's attachment to a doomed landmark was captured in a documentary, "The Last Season, The Life and Demolition of Memorial Stadium."

There was also a plan initially to keep the front of the stadium as a dedication to commemorate all who served America during both World Wars, but it had to also be taken down because alone, it was structurally unsafe.

=== New field ===
In 2010, work started on developing a new recreational baseball/football field on the site (Cal Ripken Senior Youth Development Field), with home plate being in the same exact location as it was when Memorial Stadium existed. The field was completed in December 2010. A ribbon-cutting ceremony on December 7 was attended by Billy and Cal Ripken, and Governor Martin O'Malley.

== Layout ==
The general layout of Memorial Stadium resembled a somewhat scaled-down version of Cleveland Stadium (then home of the MLB Indians and NFL Browns). Due to the need to fit a football field on the premises, the playing area was initially quite large, especially in center field and foul territory. The construction of inner fences after 1958, however, reduced the size of the outfield. The addition of several rows of box seats also reduced the foul ground, ultimately making the stadium much more of a hitters' park than it was originally. It did host the Major League Baseball All-Star Game that year. Memorial Stadium was one of the nation's few venues to host a World Series, an MLB All-Star Game, and an NFL Championship game.

=== Incidents ===
At least two serious incidents occurred within Baltimore Memorial Stadium.

==== Fatal escalator accident ====
On May 2, 1964, a freak accident involving a stadium escalator caused the death of a teenaged girl and injuries to 46 other children. That day, the Orioles held "Safety Patrol Day" to honor schoolchildren who served in their schools' safety patrols, in which they helped their fellow students travel to and from school safely. For the event, 20,000 schoolchildren from around the state of Maryland were given free admission to the Orioles' game against the Cleveland Indians.

While the national anthem was playing before the start of the game, hundreds of children began getting onto an escalator that traveled from the lower deck to the upper deck on the stadium's third base side. Unfortunately, while three or four children at a time were getting on the escalator at the bottom, the top of the escalator was partially blocked by a narrow metal gate that allowed only one person to pass through. The mass of children was thus blocked at the top, and children began falling back on top of one another in a crush of bodies as other children continued to get on at the bottom and as the jagged metal steps of the escalator continued to move beneath all of them. The moving steps cut and mutilated the children until a stadium usher, 65-year-old Melville Gibson, finally reached the escalator's emergency shut-off switch and turned the escalator off. Previously, the shut-off switch had been moved to a wall across from the escalator in order to prevent pranksters from turning it off while people were on it.

A 14-year-old girl named Annette S. Costantine was killed in the accident. 46 other children were injured, some more seriously than others.

The gate at the top of the escalator — called a "people channeler" — had apparently been left there after a previous event, when the escalator's direction had been switched to move people downward. The gate's purpose was to control the flow of people getting onto the escalator. Shortly before the tragedy, Orioles management had decided to open the stadium's upper deck to Safety Patrol members who were still arriving by game time, after early-arriving children had filled the bleachers. Children heading for the upper deck then got onto the escalator. It was considered the worst accident in the history of the stadium.

==== Airplane crash ====
A small private airplane crashed on the stadium premises on December 19, 1976, just minutes after the conclusion of an NFL playoff game of the Colts' game with the Pittsburgh Steelers. The airplane, a Piper Cherokee, buzzed the stadium, and then crashed into the upper deck overlooking the south end zone. The Steelers had won the game handily (40–14), and most of the fans had already exited the section of the stadium by the time the game ended. There were four light injuries, and the pilot was arrested for reckless flying.

The pilot was Donald Kroner, 33 years old at the time. Kroner had earlier been charged with reckless flying, littering, and making a bomb threat against former Baltimore Colts linebacker Bill Pellington. Pellington owned a bar and restaurant from which Kroner was ejected for using foul language, and Kroner had buzzed the restaurant while dropping trash on it. Nevertheless, the incident did not stop Kroner from renting two airplanes on the day of the playoff game.

== Teams hosted ==
=== Baseball ===
- Baltimore Orioles, International League, July 1944 – 1953
- Baltimore Orioles, American League, 1954–1991
- United States Congressional Baseball Game, 1973–1976
- Bowie Baysox, Eastern League (Orioles farm club), 1993

=== Football ===
Professional
- Baltimore Colts, All-America Football Conference 1947–1949, NFL 1950
- Baltimore Colts, National Football League, 1953–1983
- Baltimore CFL Colts/Stallions, Canadian Football League, 1994–1995
- Baltimore Ravens, National Football League, 1996–1997

College/University/Military Academies
- University of Maryland Terrapins (big games, 1920s-1930s)
- Navy Midshipmen football (big games, 1920s-1933, 1935-60, 1986, 1988)

=== Soccer ===
- Baltimore Bays (1967–1968), North American Soccer League (NASL)
- Baltimore Comets (1974), NASL

== Attendance ==
Baltimore Orioles Attendance at Memorial Stadium
Year	Total attendance	Game average	AL rank
1954	1,060,910	13,778	5th
1955	852,039	10,785	7th
1956	901,201	11,704	6th
1957	1,029,581	13,371	5th
1958	829,991	10,641	5th
1959	891,926	11,435	7th
1960	1,187,849	15,427	3rd
1961	951,089	11,599	5th
1962	790,254	9,637	6th
1963	774,343	9,560	7th
1964	1,116,215	13,612	4th
1965	781,649	9,894	6th
1966	1,203,366	15,232	3rd
1967	955,053	12,403	6th
1968	943,977	11,800	6th
1969	1,062,069	13,112	5th
1970	1,057,069	13,050	6th
1971	1,023,037	13,286	3rd
1972	899,950	11,688	6th
1973	958,667	11,835	9th
1974	962,572	11,884	8th
1975	1,002,157	13,015	9th
1976	1,058,609	13,069	6th
1977	1,195,769	14,763	10th
1978	1,051,724	12,984	10th
1979	1,681,009	21,279	6th
1980	1,797,438	22,191	6th
1981	1,024,247	18,623	8th
1982	1,613,031	19,671	8th
1983	2,042,071	25,211	5th
1984	2,045,784	25,257	5th
1985	2,132,387	26,326	6th
1986	1,973,176	24,977	6th
1987	1,835,692	22,386	9th
1988	1,660,738	20,759	10th
1989	2,535,208	31,299	4th
1990	2,415,189	30,190	5th
1991	2,552,753	31,515	5th

== Seating capacity ==
Baseball
Years	Capacity
1950–1952	31,000
1953–1956	47,866
1957–1960	47,778
1961	49,375
1962–1963	49,373
1964	51,991
1965	52,184
1966–1968	52,185
1969–1977	52,137
1978–1979	52,860
1980–1981	52,696
1982–1984	53,208
1985	54,062
1986	54,076
1987	54,002
1988–1990	54,017
1991–1997	53,371

Football
Years	Capacity
1950–1952	31,000
1953–1957	52,060
1958–1959	57,557
1960	57,808
1961	57,641
1962	57,966
1963	60,065
1964	60,213
1965–1969	60,238
1970–1975	60,240
1976–1980	60,020
1981–1995	60,586

Years	Capacity
1996–1997	65,248

== Gallery ==
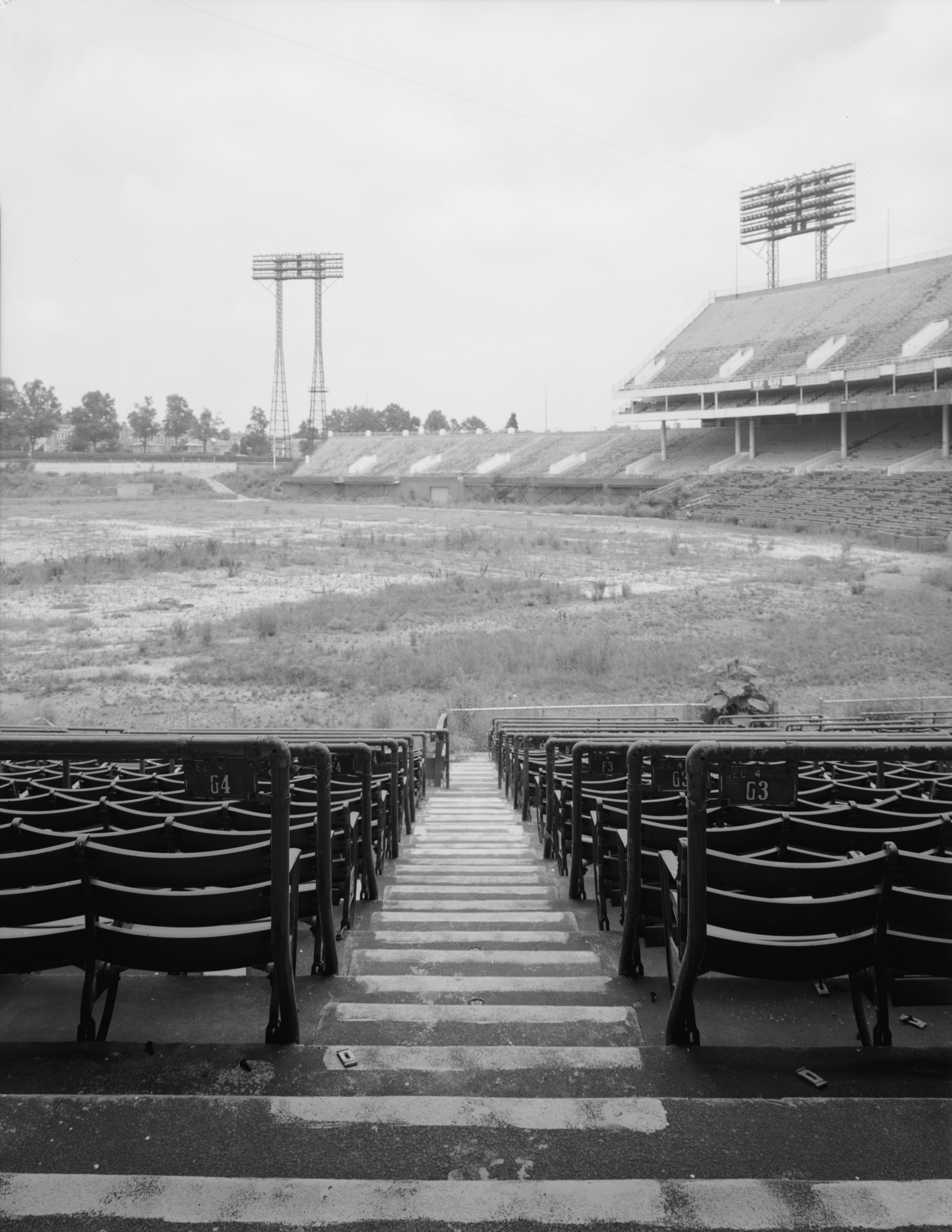

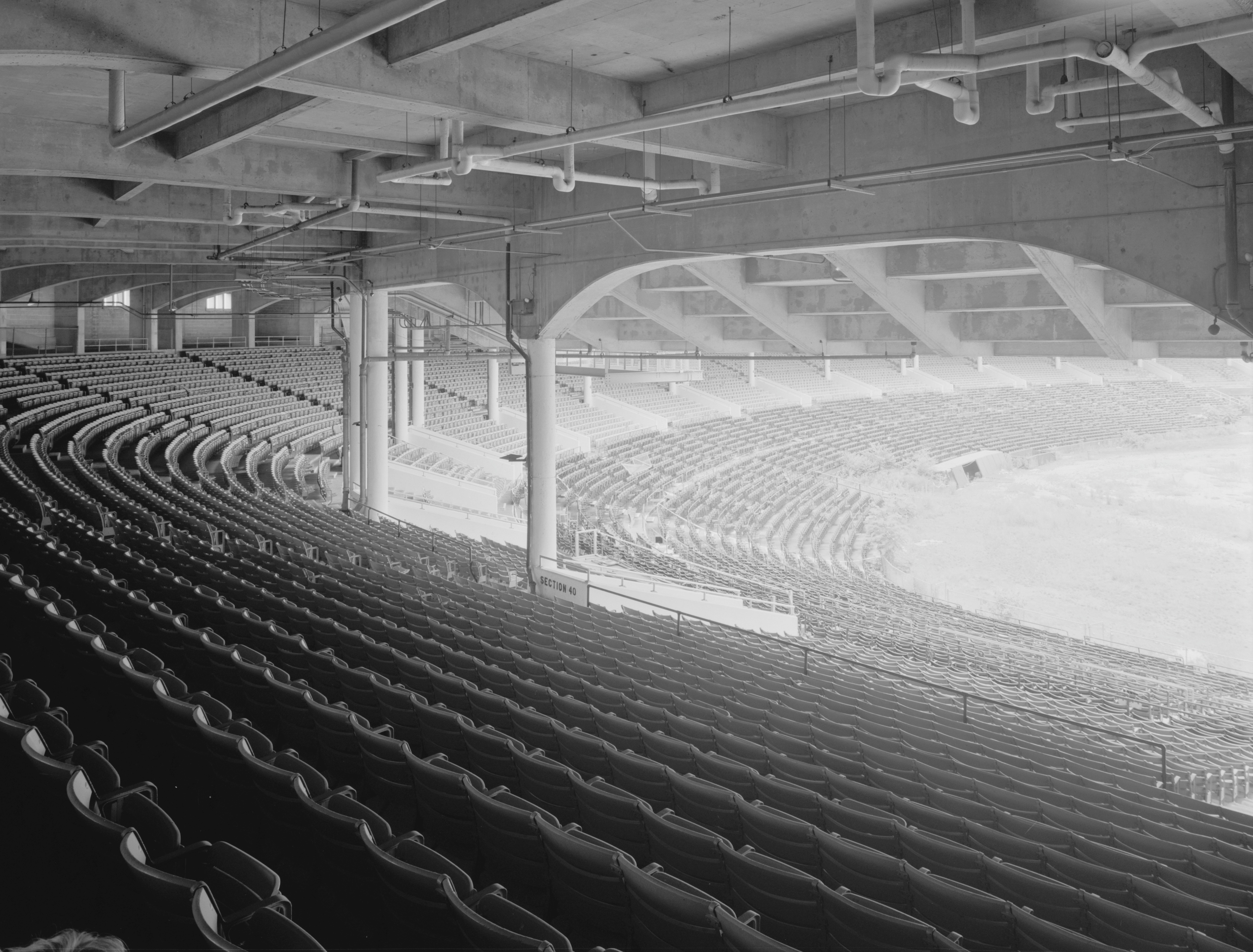

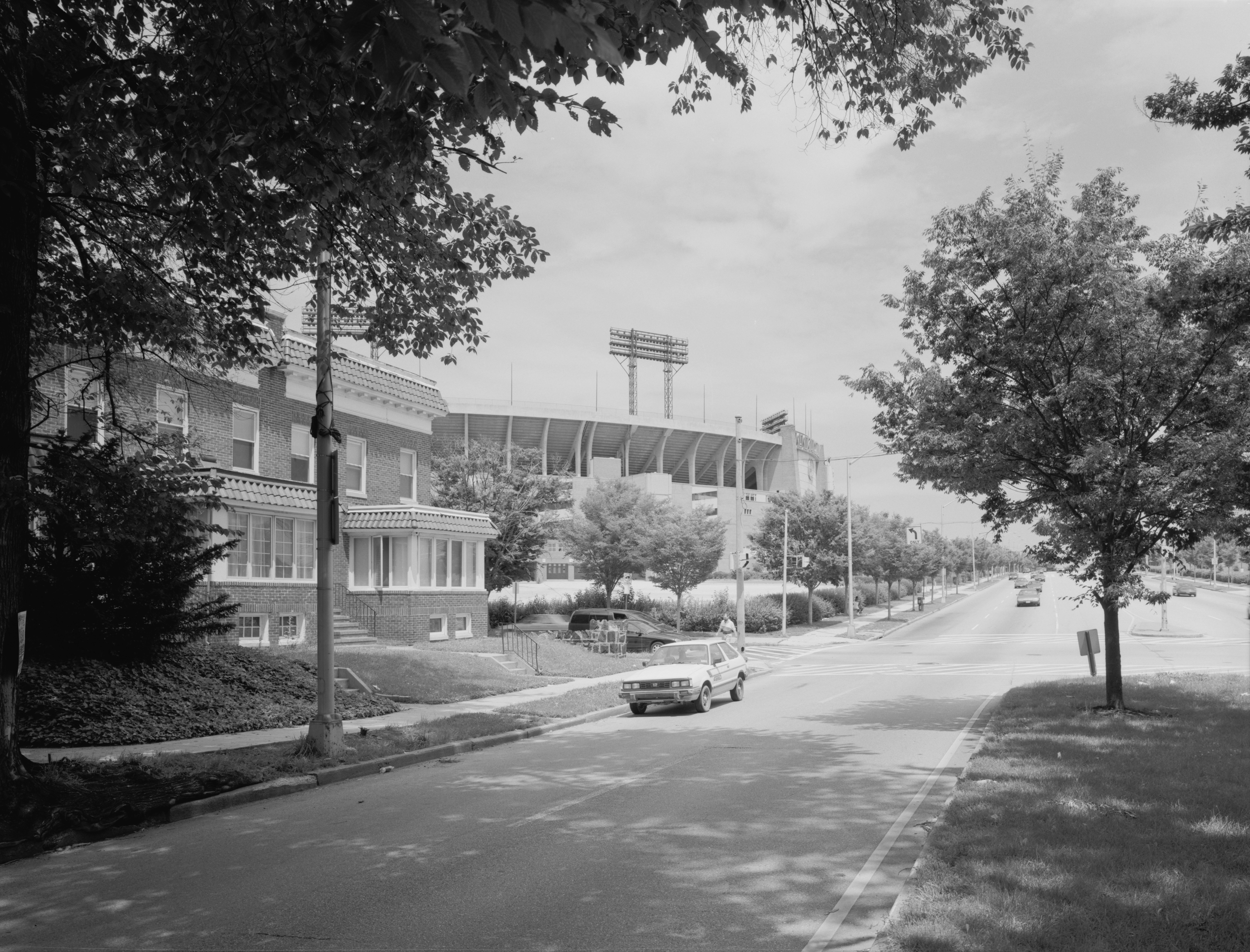

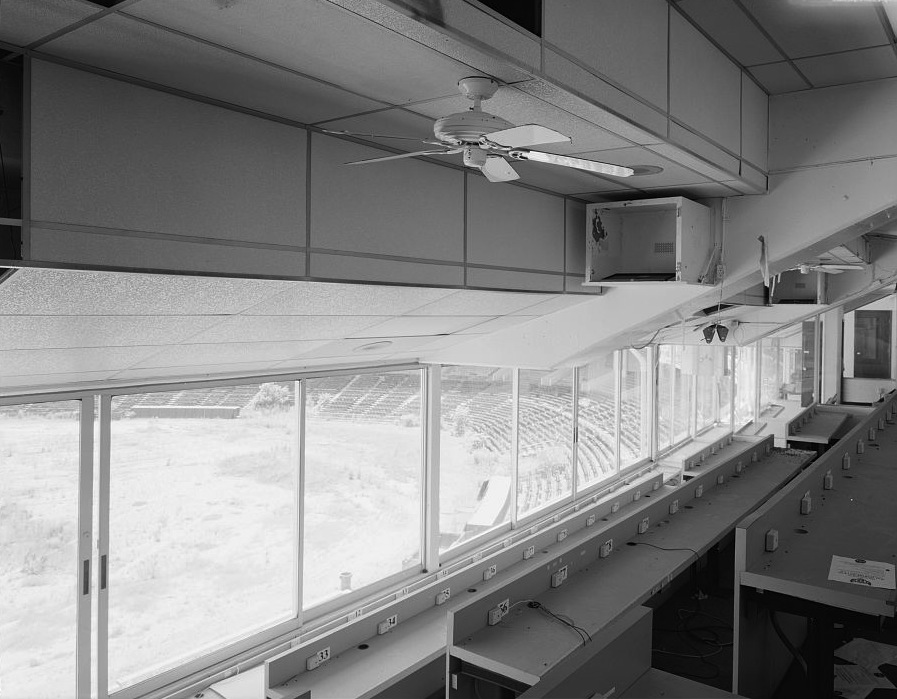

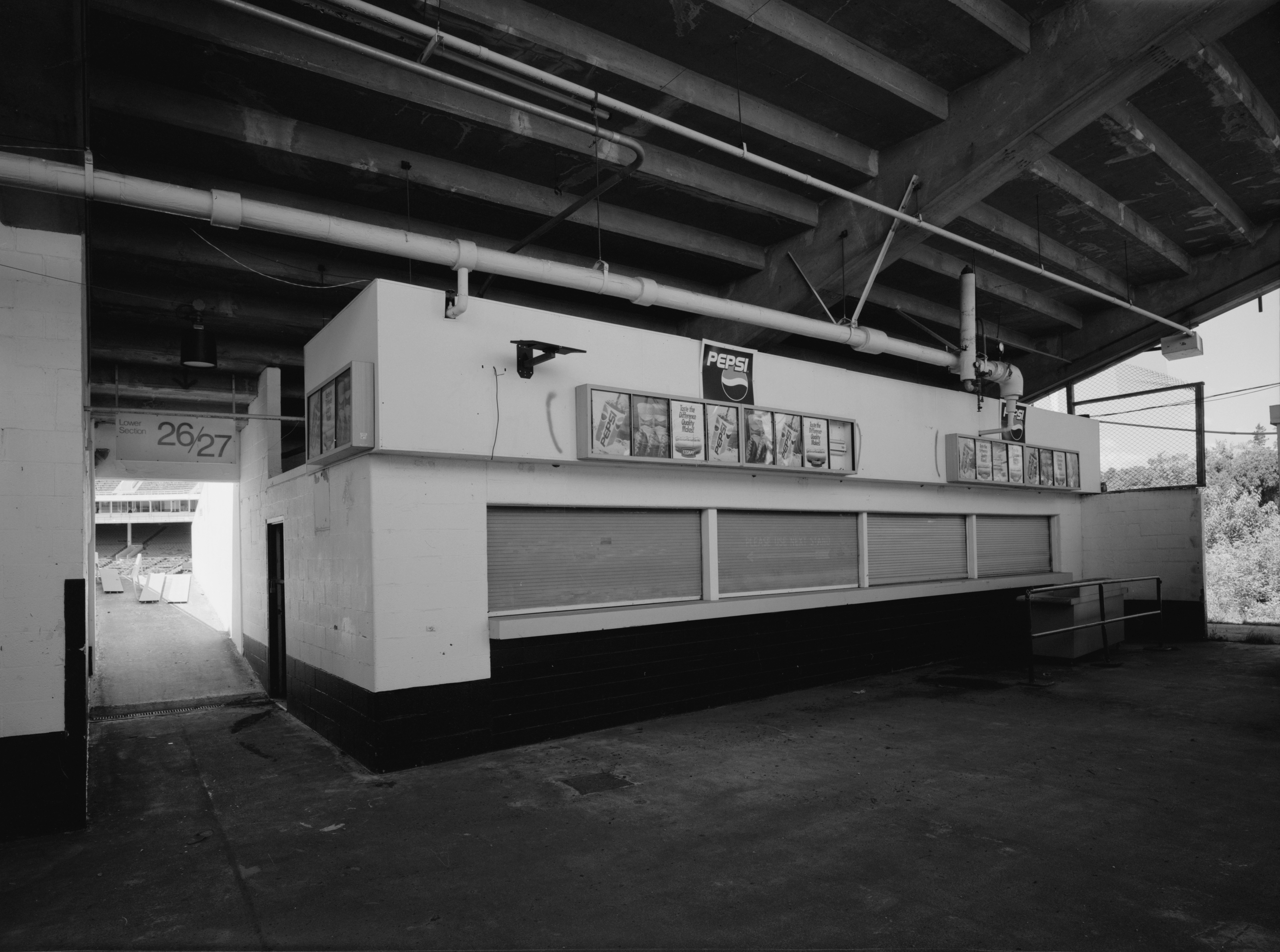

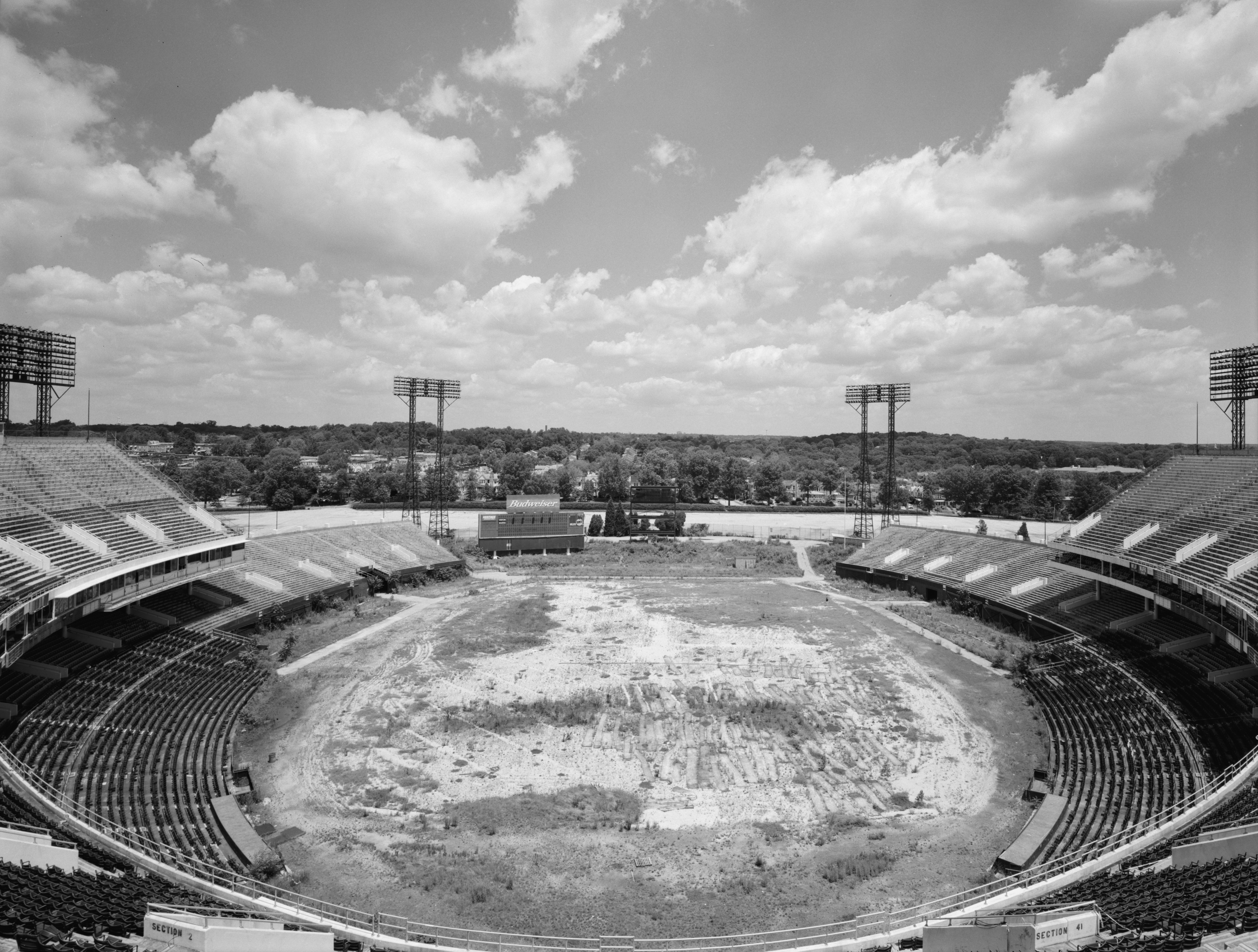

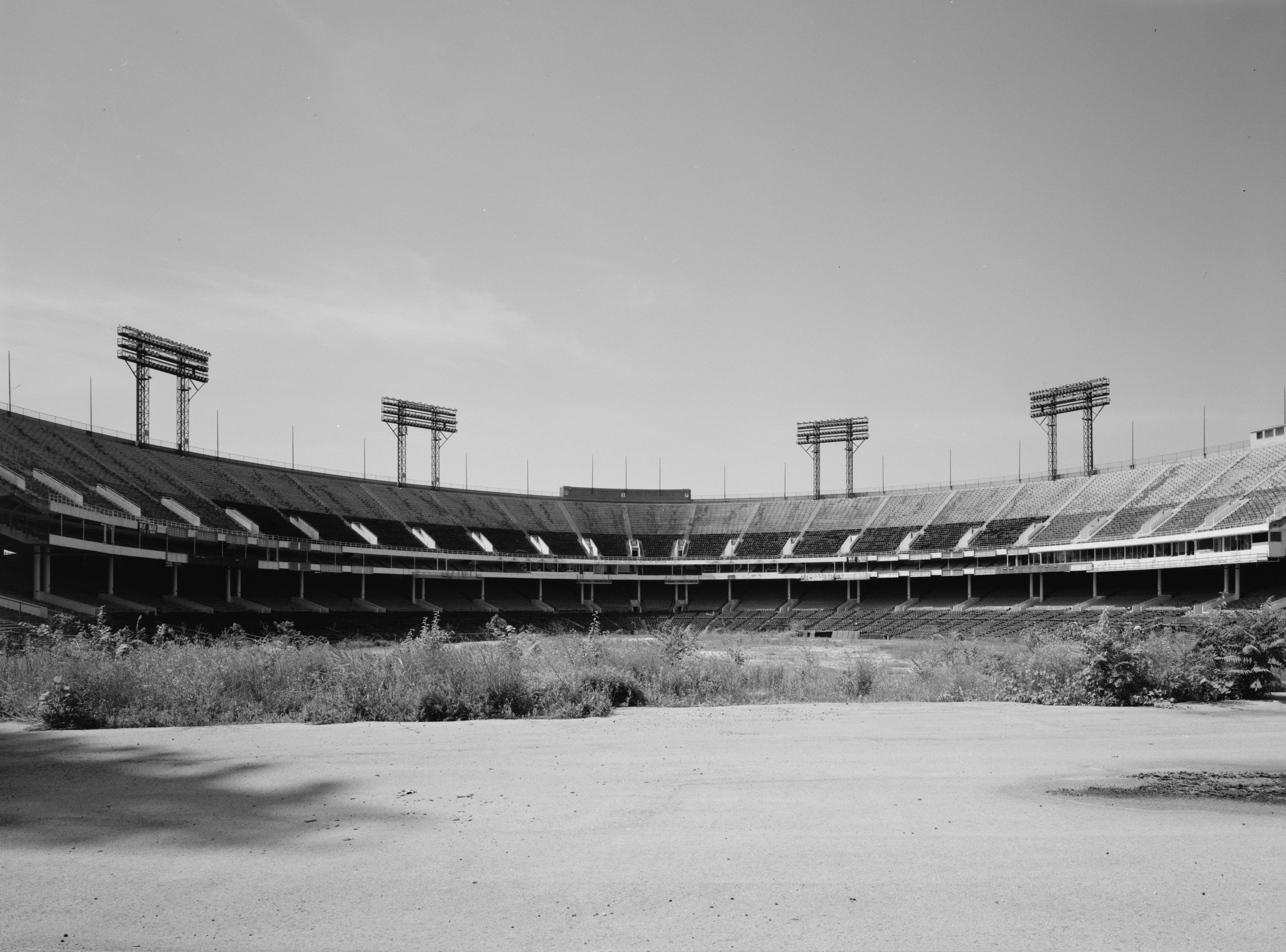

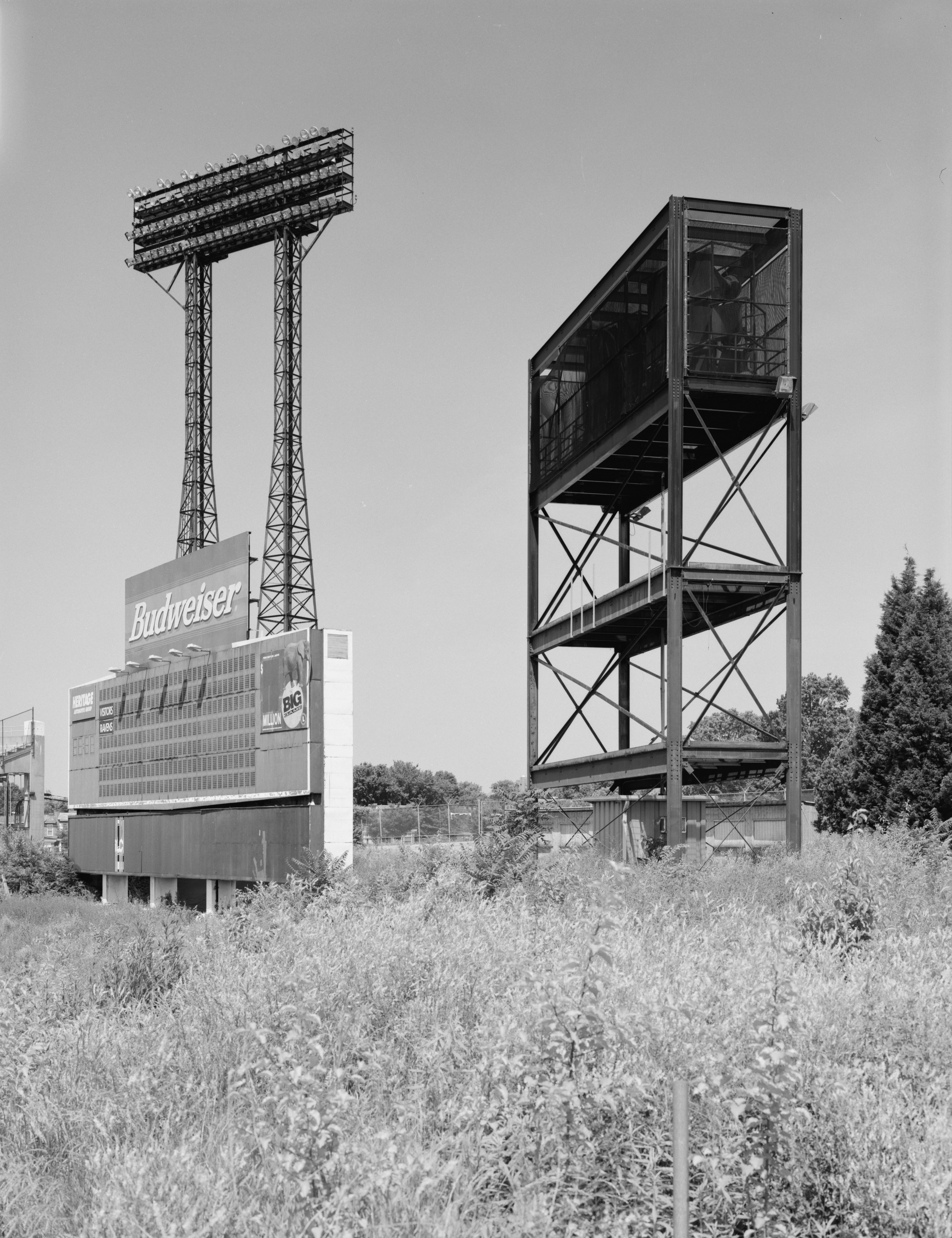

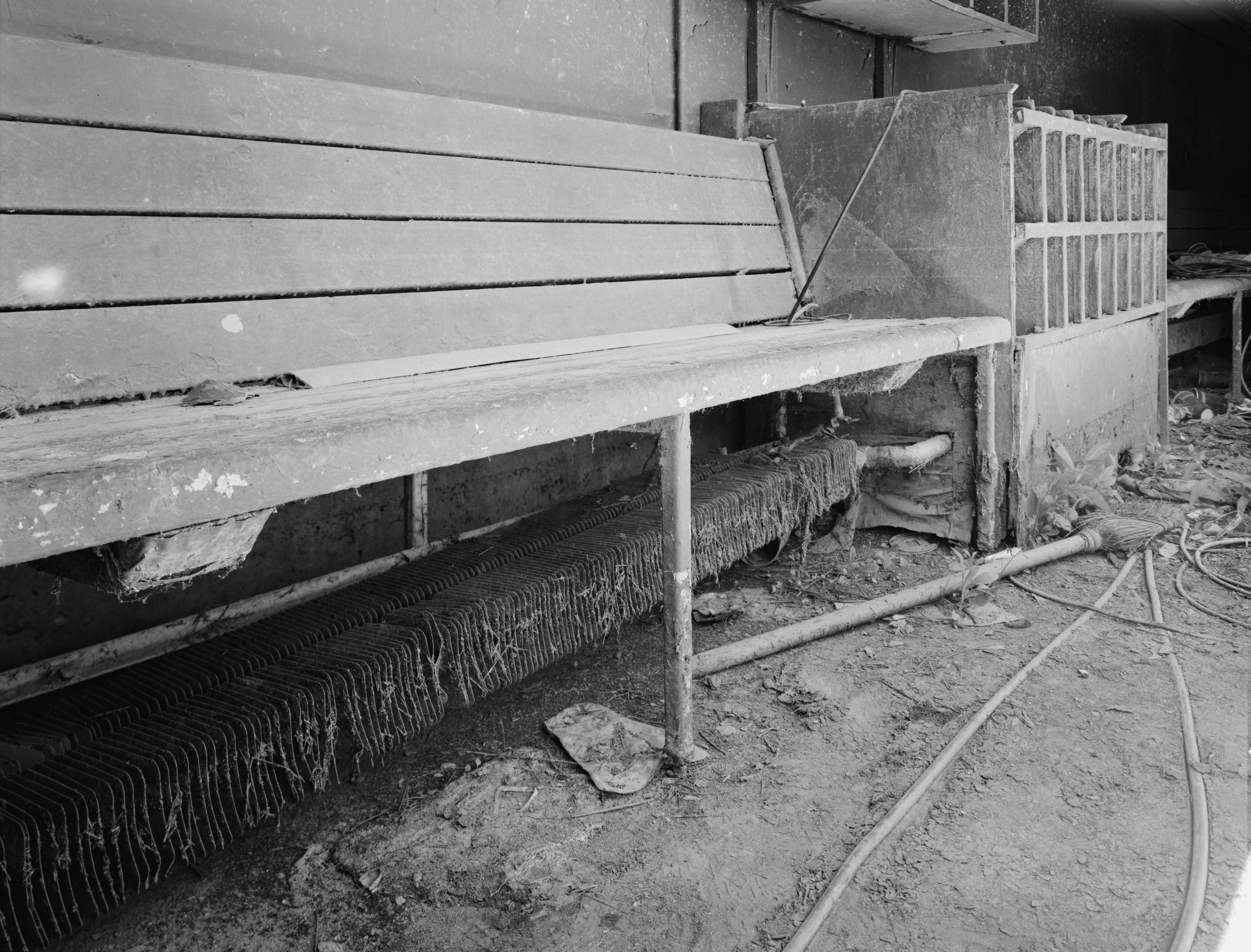

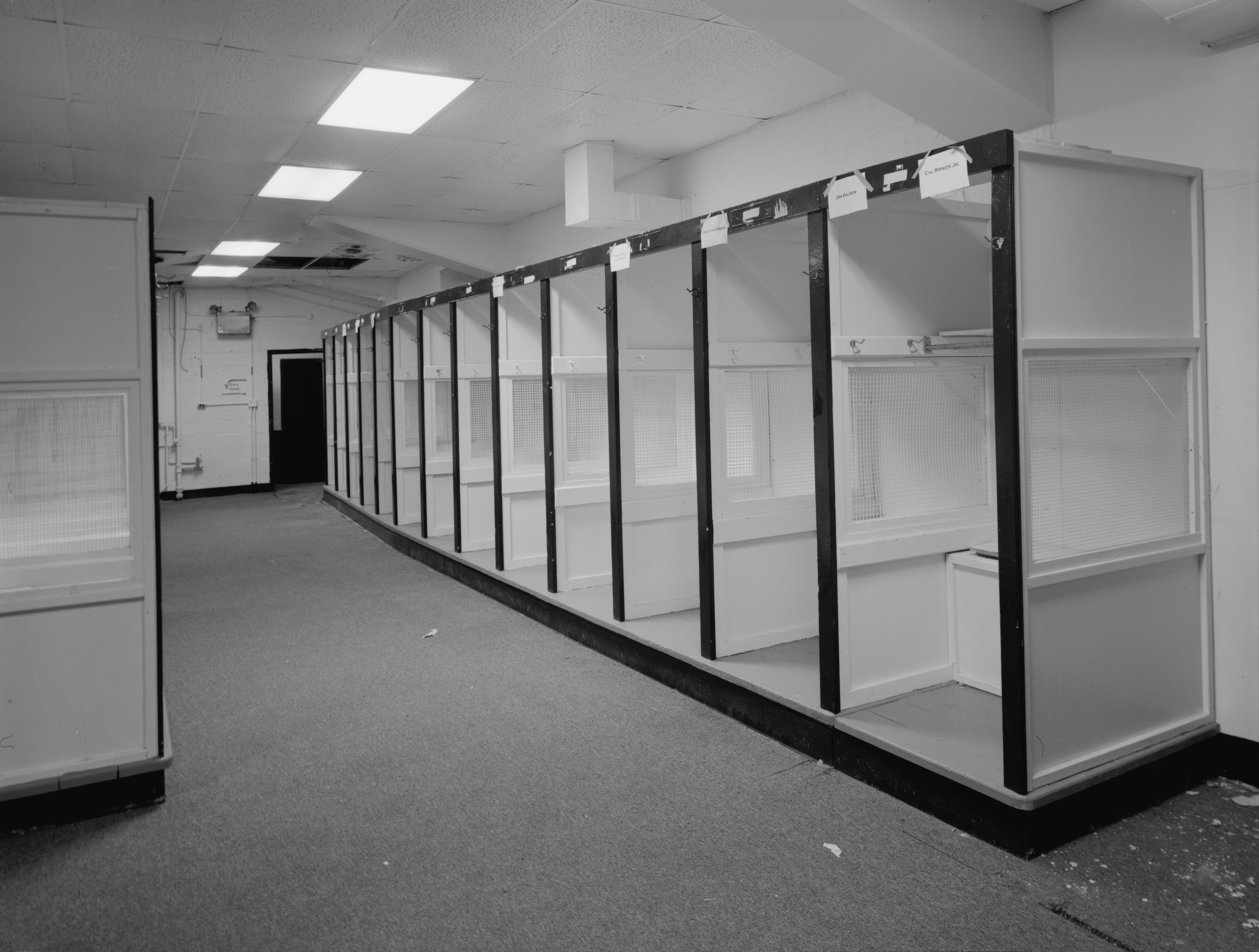

== See also ==
- Wild Bill Hagy

Events and tenants
Preceded by Oriole Park	Home of the Baltimore Orioles (minor league); July 4, 1944–1953	Succeeded by Final stadium
Preceded by First stadium	Home of the Baltimore Colts; 1953–1983	Succeeded by Hoosier Dome
Preceded by Sportsman's Park	Home of the Baltimore Orioles; 1954–1991	Succeeded by Oriole Park at Camden Yards
Preceded by Sportsman's Park	Host of the All-Star Game; 1958	Succeeded by Forbes Field
Preceded by RFK Stadium	Home of the United States Congressional Baseball Game; 1973–1976	Succeeded by Langley High School
Preceded by Municipal Stadium	Home of the Bowie Baysox; 1993	Succeeded by Prince George's Stadium
Preceded by First stadium	Home of the Baltimore Stallions; 1994–1995	Succeeded by Olympic Stadium
Preceded by first stadium	Home of the Baltimore Ravens; 1996–1997	Succeeded by Ravens Stadium at Camden Yards
Preceded by First stadium	Host of AFC Championship Game; 1971	Succeeded by Miami Orange Bowl
