= Congressional Soccer Match =

Annual match that members and employees of the US Congress participate

- Democrats Republicans
- Sport: Soccer
- Location: Washington, D.C.
- First meeting: Team Gray 6–6 Team Yellow (April 24, 2013)
- Latest meeting: Republicans 7 vs 5 Democrats (June 3, 2026)
- Next meeting: Spring 2027
- Stadiums: Hotchkiss Field (2013); RFK Stadium (2014–2017); Buchanan Field (2018); Audi Field (2019, 2022–2026)

Statistics
- Total meetings: 12
- Largest victory: Republicans 8–4 Democrats (April 13, 2015)

The Congressional Soccer Match (CSM) is an annual event held in Washington, D.C., that features Members of Congress, Hill staffers, corporations, and community members to participate in a soccer tournament.

The event has historically consisted of an Embassy Tournament, the Congressional Soccer Match, and a Congressional Staff vs. Lobbyist Match.

In 2025, the format was updated to feature two 20-minute 7v7 matches decided by aggregate score for both the Congressional Soccer Match and the Congressional Staff vs. Lobbyist Match. New additions to the festivities included a skills challenge involving participants from the Embassy community, local youth, and congressional staffers.

The event is hosted by the United States Soccer Foundation. As one of the Foundation’s annual charity events, all proceeds from the event support the Foundation’s life-changing programs that help children in underserved communities embrace active and healthy lifestyles while nurturing their personal growth through trained coach-mentors.

As of 2026, the defending champions are the Republicans.

== Results ==
Democrats win Republicans win Draw

| April 24, 2013 | Team Gray | 6–6 | Team Yellow | Hotchkiss Field |
| | Reichert; Van Hollen; Messer; McDermott; Doyle | Report | Jones; Reyna; Sommer; Harkes | Attendance: 400 |

| April 7, 2014 | Democrats | 7–6 | Republicans | RFK Stadium |
| | | Report | | Attendance: 800 |

| April 13, 2015 | Republicans | 8–4 | Democrats | RFK Stadium |
| | | Report | | Attendance: 800 |
Note: Two 25 minute halves

| 2016 | Democrats | 7-4 | Republicans | RFK Stadium |
| | | Report |
Note: Two 25 minute halves

| May 24, 2017 | Democrats | 5–3 | Republicans | RFK Stadium |
| | Kihuen; Larsen; Britt; Olsen; Harkes | Report | Valadao; Jones; McTavish | Attendance: 1,000 |
Note: Two 25 minute halves

| May 23, 2018 | Democrats | 5–4 | Republicans | Buchanan Field |
| | Kihuen 1' | Report | | Attendance: 600 |
Note: Two 35 minute halves

| May 21, 2019 | Republicans | 6–5 | Democrats | Audi Field |
| | | Report | | Attendance: 1,000 |
Note: Two 45 minute halves

| May 2020 | Cancelled due to the COVID-19 pandemic |

| May 2021 | Cancelled due to the COVID-19 pandemic |

| April 27, 2022 | Democrats | 5–3 | Republicans | Audi Field |
| | Salazar 34'; Brian McMillan (Sr. Counsel for Rep. Swalwell) 38'; Olsen 40'; Nguyen 45'; Eric Fins (Deputy Staff Director for Rep. Castor) 68' | | Rep. Gonzalez 14'; Rep. Gallagher 20' pk; Quaranta 65' | Attendance: 1,000; Referee: John Loy; AR1 - Adam Mitchell; AR2 - Andrew Smith; 4th Official - Marc Larance |
Note: Two 35 minute halves

| June 13, 2023 | Republicans | 4–2 | Democrats | Audi Field |
| | Amir Lowery, Amir Lowery, Alecko Eskandarian, Amir Lowery | Report | Kash Siddiqi, Sean Boyle | Attendance: 1,300 |
Note: Two 35 minute halves

| May 8, 2024 | Republicans | 4–3 | Democrats | Audi Field |
| | Jeremy McNeil, Paul Hastings, LLP - 26 Jonathan Day, Chief of Staff for Rep. Joe Wilson (R-SC) - 52 min Victor Ulloa, MLS Great - 70 min Jose Mercado, DoorDash - 77 min | Report | Dwayne De Rosario, MLS Great - 7 Dwayne De Rosario, MLS Great - 73 Dwayne De Rosario, MLS Great - 78 | Attendance: 1200; Referee: Josh Pitt, Referee Miguel Llamas, Assistant Referee Adam Gallini, Second Assistant Referee Casey Burridge, Fourth Official |
Note: 40 min halves = 80min total

| May 7, 2025 | Democrats | 6–4 | Republicans | Audi Field |
| | | Report | | Attendance: 1500 |
Note: The match featured two 20-minute games in a 7v7 format, with the winner determined by aggregate score.

| June 3, 2026 | Republicans | 7–5 | Democrats | Audi Field |
| | | Report | | Attendance: 1500 |
Note: The match featured two 25-minute games in a 9v9 format, with the winner determined by aggregate score.

Congressional Staff vs Lobbyists
| Year | Format | Final | Score | | | Champion |
|---|---|---|---|---|---|---|
| 2023 | One 11v11 match consisting of two 25-minute halves. | Congressional Staff vs Lobbyist | 0 | vs | 1 | Lobbyist Team |
| 2024 | One 11v11 match consisting of two 25-minute halves. | Congressional Staff vs Lobbyist | 2 | vs | 2 | Lobbyist Team wins in PKs 3-1 (3Pks) |
| 2025 | The match featured two 20-minute games in a 7v7 format, with the winner determined by aggregate score. | Congressional Staff vs Lobbyist | 4 | vs | 9 | Lobbyists Teams |
| 2026 | The match featured two 20-minute games in a 7v7 format, with the winner determined by aggregate score. | Congressional Staff vs Lobbyist | 7 | vs | 5 | Congressional Staff |

== Embassy Tournament ==
Congressional Soccer Match - Embassy Tournament
| Year | Format | Final | Score | | | Champion |
|---|---|---|---|---|---|---|
| 2017 | Round robin | | | | | Spain |
| 2018 | Round robin | | | | | Georgia |
| 2019 | 16 (round robin + knockout stage) | Denmark vs Norway | 1 | vs | 0 | Denmark |
| 2022 | 21 (round robin + knockout stage) | Croatia vs United Kingdom | 2 | vs | 1 | Croatia |
| 2023 | 16 (round robin + knockout stage) | Ukraine vs Denmark | 0 | vs | 1 | Denmark |
| 2024 | 16 (round robin + knockout stage) | Denmark vs Chile | 1 | vs | 2 | Chile |
| 2025 | Format Change | Did not happen | | | | |
| 2026 | Embassy Cup Final | Denmark vs Saudi Arabia | 2 | vs | 2* (penalty kicks) | Saudi Arabia |

== See also ==
- Congressional Baseball Game
- Soccer in the United States
