= Roll Call =

American political and legislative reporting and elections news publication

- Type: Periodical newspaper
- Format: Newspaper
- Owner: FiscalNote
- Founder: Sid Yudain
- Editor: Ed Timms
- Founded: June 16, 1955
- Political alignment: Nonpartisan
- Language: American English
- Headquarters: 1625 Eye Street NW; Suite 200; Washington, DC 20006
- Country: United States
- Circulation: 30,786 (June 2017)
- OCLC number: 44314138
- Website: rollcall.com

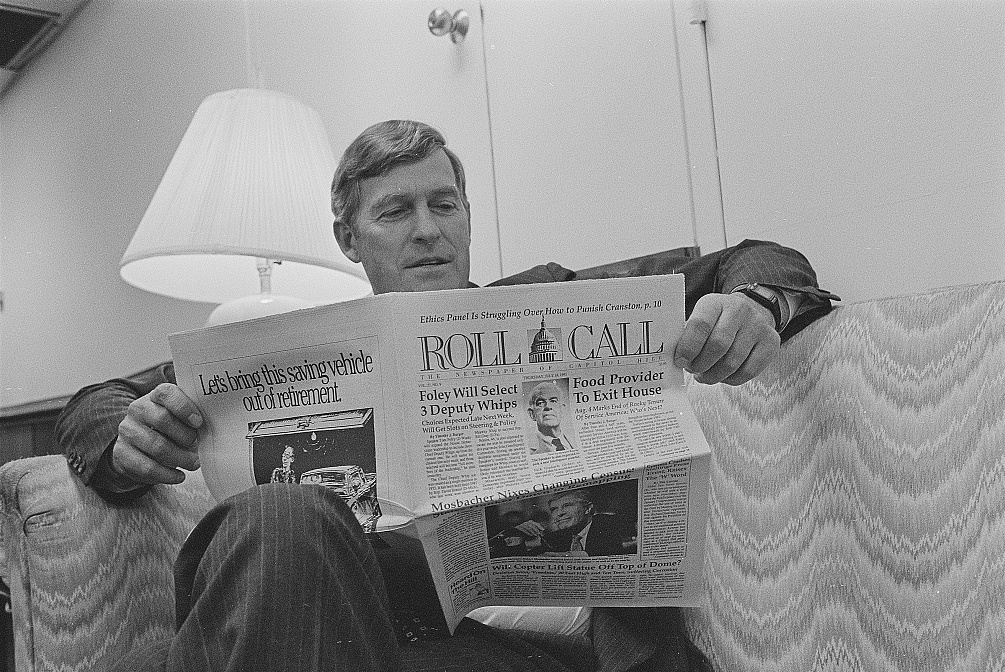
Senator Tim Wirth reading an issue of Roll Call in 1991

Roll Call is a newspaper and online publication based in Washington, D.C. When the United States Congress is in session, it reports news of legislative and political maneuverings on Capitol Hill, as well as covering congressional elections across the country.

Roll Call is the flagship publication of CQ Roll Call, which also operates CQ (formerly Congressional Quarterly), publisher of a subscriber-based service for daily and weekly news about Congress and politics, as well as a weekly magazine. Former Roll Call columnists included Walter Shapiro, Patricia Murphy, and Stuart Rothenberg.

== History ==
Roll Call was founded in 1955 by Sid Yudain, a press secretary to Congressman Al Morano (R-Conn.). The inaugural issue of the newspaper was published on June 16, 1955, with an initial printing of 10,000 copies. Richard Nixon then Vice President of the United States, wrote a letter to Yudain congratulating him on the new venture. Nixon's letter ran on the front page of the inaugural issue.

In 1986, Yudain sold Roll Call to Arthur Levitt Jr., who was chairman of the American Stock Exchange at the time. Yudain continued to work as a columnist for Roll Call after the sale.

The Economist Group acquired Roll Call in 1993, immediately following Leavitt's appointment as 25th chairman of the US Securities and Exchange Commission (SEC). Roll Call merged with CQ in 2009 after CQ was purchased by The Economist Group.

In July 2018, CQ Roll Call was acquired by FiscalNote.

== Brand franchises ==
=== "Heard on the Hill" ===
In January 1988, Roll Call launched the "Heard on the Hill" column, which covers the intrigue of life and work in and around Capitol Hill. Alex Gangitano wrote "Heard on the Hill" from 2014 to 2018 before leaving to cover lobbying for "The Hill". On 30 April 2019, Roll Call announced the current Heard on the Hill writing team of Clyde McGrady and Kathryn Lyons.

=== Congressional Baseball Game ===
In 1962, Roll Call began sponsoring the annual Congressional Baseball Game for Charity. In 1965, the first Roll Call Trophy was awarded to the Republican team, which was the first team to win three games since Roll Call began its sponsorship. Since then, a trophy has been awarded to the next team that wins three games (over the next three, four, or five years), following the year in which the most recent trophy was awarded. Roll Call also sponsors the Congressional Baseball Hall of Fame.

=== "Hill Pinup" Feature (1957-1974) ===
From 1957 until 1974, Roll Call featured a section titled "Hill Pinup," which showcased female Capitol Hill staffers in posed photographs with brief profiles. The subjects were typically secretaries or assistants to members of Congress, selected for their appearance and personality, with lawmakers occasionally suggesting their staff. The feature was considered prestigious by many who appeared in it, though attitudes changed over time. Linda Steele, a former Congressional staffer who was once profiled, recalled in a 2016 interview: "I doubt that any woman working on Capitol Hill now would even agree to do that, because in today's world it probably would be like a kiss of death, from a career standpoint." The feature was discontinued as social attitudes evolved and "photographers got skittish about taking it," according to Yudain. This change coincided with Roll Call's transition away from being "a polite purveyor of secretaries' pinups and ladies' lunch notices" toward more politically focused content. The feature was replaced with a "Hill Personalities" feature in 1975.

== Notable Roll Call staff ==
- Kathryn Lyons, Heard on the Hill reporter
- Camila Dechalus, Immigration Reporter
- Rebecca Adams, Senior Editor
- Megan Scully, Senior Editor
- Ed Timms, Investigations Editor
- Herb Jackson, Politics Editor
- Jason Dick, Deputy Editor
- Lindsey Gilbert, Deputy Editor
- Lindsey McPherson, Senior Writer
- Niels Lesniewski, Senior Writer
- John M. Donnelly, Senior Writer
- Jennifer Shutt, Budget and Appropriations Reporter
- Bridget Bowman, Politics Reporter
- Simone Pathé, Politics Reporter
- Stephanie Akin, Politics Reporter
- Kate Ackley, Lobbying Reporter

== Notable Roll Call alumni ==
- Mary Ann Akers, staff writer for Politico
- Christina Bellantoni, assistant managing editor for politics for Los Angeles Times
- Chris Cillizza, politics reporter and editor-at-large for CNN
- Tim Curran, Sunday Editor for The Washington Post
- Steven T. Dennis, Senate reporter for Bloomberg
- Matt Fuller, politics editor for The Daily Beast
- Emily Heil, co-author the Reliable Source, The Washington Post
- Ed Henry, chief national correspondent for Fox News Channel
- Paul Kane, senior congressional correspondent for The Washington Post
- Pablo Manriquez, publicist at Center for Investigative Reporting
- Steve Kornacki, national political correspondent for NBC News and MSNBC
- John McArdle, producer and co-host for C-SPAN's Washington Journal
- Norah O'Donnell, co-anchor for CBS This Morning
- Ben Pershing, Managing Editor for National Journal
- Mark Preston, executive editor for CNN Politics
- Glenn R. Simpson, co-founder of Fusion GPS
- Jake Tapper, anchor for CNN's The Lead with Jake Tapper and State of the Union
- Katherine Tully-McManus, Congressional Reporter for Politico
- Nina Totenberg, correspondent for National Public Radio
- Jim VandeHei, co-founder and CEO of Axios; former executive editor and co-founder of Politico
- Rachel Van Dongen, editor of PowerPost for The Washington Post

== Political Theater Podcast ==
Political Theater Podcast is a Roll Call podcast hosted by Jason Dick. Jason Dick and the Roll Call team spotlight the spectacle, the players, and what’s going on behind the scenes in Congress.

== CQ Budget Podcast ==
CQ Budget Podcast is a Roll Call podcast hosted by budget tracker David Lerman. Lerman explains how lawmakers in Congress spend the nation’s money.

== See also ==
- List of newspapers in Washington, D.C.
