= Venable Park =

Coordinates: 39°19′46″N 76°36′5″W

Venable Park is a former city park located in the Waverly neighborhood of Baltimore, Maryland, United States.

The park opened in about 1908 and was originally called Holyrood Park. In 1910 it was renamed Venable Park, after the recently deceased president of the city park board, Richard M. Venable. The Baltimore Sun for April 14, 1922, indicates the park boundaries as Ellerslie Avenue to the west and Gorsuch Street to the south, cut in half by 33rd Street. A new stadium was to be built on the north side of 33rd.

In 1922 the city built Venable Stadium on the site of the former park. It gradually became known as Baltimore Municipal Stadium, or more commonly Municipal Stadium. Between 1949 and 1950 the stadium was disassembled/razed and replaced simultaneously on the same structural footprint by Baltimore's better known Memorial Stadium. Games continued to be regularly played in the venue during this period and aerial photos from the era reveal one venue gradually disappearing while another rises.

After Memorial Stadium was razed in 2002, an apartment complex and playing field were built on the site. Some maps began to, after roughly an 80+ year absence, label a small grassy area adjacent to the apartments as Venable Park.

The south portion of the park became the site for Eastern High School, which eventually was converted into a facility for Johns Hopkins University.

The novel Venable Park was released in 2010 and was re-released in April 2015 by Loyola University Maryland's Apprentice House. The novel is set in 1924 in two primary locales, Venable Stadium and the former company steel town of Sparrows Point, Maryland.
