= U.S. Soccer Foundation =

The U.S. Soccer Foundation was established in 1994 and serves as the major charitable arm of soccer in the United States.

The mission of the U.S. Soccer Foundation is to enhance, assist and grow the sport of soccer in the United States, with a special emphasis on underserved communities.

The foundation is a leader in sports-based youth development and is using soccer for social change among youth in urban areas. It provides nationally recognized programs to deliver positive health and social outcomes. The foundation's initiatives offer safe, urban environments in which both boys and girls thrive.

Since its inception, the foundation has awarded over $57 million in financial support to soccer organizations and field-building initiatives nationwide. Through the Passback program, the foundation has collected and redistributed close to 900,000 pieces of soccer equipment for children in need worldwide. In addition, the foundation currently providing children in 20 cities across the country with physical activity, nutrition education and mentorship through our Soccer for Success program.

== Programs ==
- Soccer for Success is the U.S. Soccer Foundation's free soccer-based afterschool program that uses soccer as a tool to combat childhood obesity and promote healthy lifestyles for children in under-resourced urban communities. The foundation partners with community-based organizations across the country to operate Soccer for Success sites – providing thousands of children with free afterschool programming three times per week for the entire school year.
- The Safe Places to Play program provides grants to organizations to help them build or enhance a field space in their communities.
- Passback is the U.S. Soccer Foundation's soccer equipment collection and distribution program. Through the Passback Program, new and gently used soccer gear is collected by organizations, teams, clubs, and individuals and is redistributed across the globe to help underserved communities play soccer.
- Congressional Soccer Match

== Grants ==
The U.S. Soccer Foundation awards grants on an annual basis to support both soccer programs and field-building initiatives in underserved areas nationwide. Grants are provided to support all aspects of the beautiful game - from assisting programs with operational costs to creating Safe Places to Play. Click here to learn more about the Foundation's grants process.

== Advocacy ==
The U.S. Soccer Foundation is located in Washington, D.C. and leads advocacy efforts on Capitol Hill and with Executive Branch agencies for the entire soccer community. The U.S. Soccer Foundation's advocacy efforts focus on using sport as a vehicle to promote youth development, health and wellness, and positive social change. This includes combating childhood obesity, preventing youth delinquency, and providing youth with safe and accessible places to play — a critical need particularly in underserved communities.
