= Sid Yudain =

American journalist

Sidney Lawrence "Sid" Yudain (May 6, 1923 – October 20, 2013) was an American journalist who founded Roll Call in 1955 as a community newspaper focused on the United States Congress and Capitol Hill. Yudain published the first issue of Roll Call June 16, 1955, with an initial printing of 10,000 copies. Roll Call currently publishes four issues per week, with a circulation of more than 22,000, as of October 2013.

== Biography ==
=== Early life ===
Yudain, the seventh of eight children of Morris Yudain and Berta Jaffe, was born on May 6, 1923, in New Canaan, Connecticut. His parents had immigrated to the United States from the Russian Empire in 1907. Morris Yudain (born Borris Yovanovitch <Ellis Island>) attended the art academy in Riga and studied at the University there. As a young man he served in the Russian army cavalry, and was designated for special duty in the Czar's Imperial Guard. The owner of a retail real estate in Stamford, CT and New Canaan, CT, the father later also established a real estate brokerage firm. As children, Yudain and his siblings would settle disputes by publishing little mini-newspapers using the family's Remington portable typewriter.

Yudain enlisted in the United States Army shortly after graduating from New Canaan High School. He was stationed in Malibu, California, during World War II, where be began publishing a small newspaper for his base. He remained in the Los Angeles area after World War II, where he worked as a Hollywood entertainment correspondent for a Connecticut newspaper. He also worked as a freelance writer, penning articles for fan magazines covering actors and films. He interviewed high profile actors and Hollywood figures, including Montgomery Clift, Lana Turner and Olivia de Havilland.

=== Roll Call ===
In 1951, Yudain moved to Washington D.C. to take a position as a press secretary for freshman U.S. Rep. Albert P. Morano of Connecticut. After noticing that there wasn't any newspaper that focused on the Congress as a community, Yudain conceived and founded Roll Call, a small newspaper aimed at members of Congress and their staff, in 1955. It cost Yudain $90 to establish the newspaper. He published the inaugural issue of Roll Call, which he called a community newspaper, on June 16, 1955, with an initial printing of 10,000 copies. The paper was founded and published out of Yudain's workplace in Rep. Morano's Washington congressional office. Yudain initially wrote much of the copy and articles himself.

According to the New York Times, Yudain described the early Roll Call as "part local newspaper, part trade paper, part movie fan magazine, part New Yorker." Roll Call also covered serious issues, ranging from congressional committee assignments to filibusters, but largely shied away from legislative issues until the 1990s. One of Roll Call's earliest hard news story concerned a heart attack suffered by then Texas Senator Lyndon B. Johnson just one week after the newspaper's debut. Senator Johnson wrote several Roll Call guest pieces on his recovery.

Yudain penned a Roll Call gossip column titled "Sid-Bits," which is a predecessor of Roll Call's and rollcall.com's present blog, "Heard on the Hill." Early guest columnists included U.S. Vice President Richard Nixon, who published an obituary for one of his favorite doormen in the paper. Roll Call also published a weekly pin-up picture within its early issues, which drew criticism, but proved popular with the overwhelmingly male-dominated congressional delegations. The paper focused on personal issues, such as weddings, birth announcements and personnel changes within the House and Senate.

In 1986, Yudain sold Roll Call to Arthur Levitt, who was the chairman of the American Stock Exchange at the time of the sale. Yudain continued to work as a columnist at Roll Call until 1988.

Roll Call was acquired by the Economist Group in 1992. The Economist Group purchased Congressional Quarterly (CQ) in 2009 as a "companion publication" to Roll Call. Roll Call and CQ currently form The Economist's CQ Roll Call Group.

Yudain and his wife, the former Lael Bairstow, hosted frequent large parties at their riverfront home on the Pacific Palisades in North West Washington through several Presidential administrations. The events drew members of the House and Senate, White House staff, and diplomatic corps and featured singing and music playing by the guests on a stage in the garden on the property. The parties received extensive media coverage over the years. Yudain is credited with discovering the comedian Mark Russell, who often performed at these events. The family was listed in the Washington Social Directory .

Yudain died from liver cancer on the morning of October 20, 2013, at his home in Arlington, Virginia, at the age 90. He was survived by his wife of 40 years, Lael, whom he married in 1973; two children, Rachel Kuchinad and Raymond Yudain; and four grandchildren, Owen, Lucas, Charlotte, and Max. He was buried at Arlington National Cemetery in Jewish ceremony and a memorial service was held at the National Press Club.
