= June 1923 =

Month of 1923

<<	June 1923					>>
Su	Mo	Tu	We	Th	Fr	Sa
					1	2
3	4	5	6	7	8	9
10	11	12	13	14	15	16
17	18	19	20	21	22	23
24	25	26	27	28	29	30

The following events occurred in June 1923:

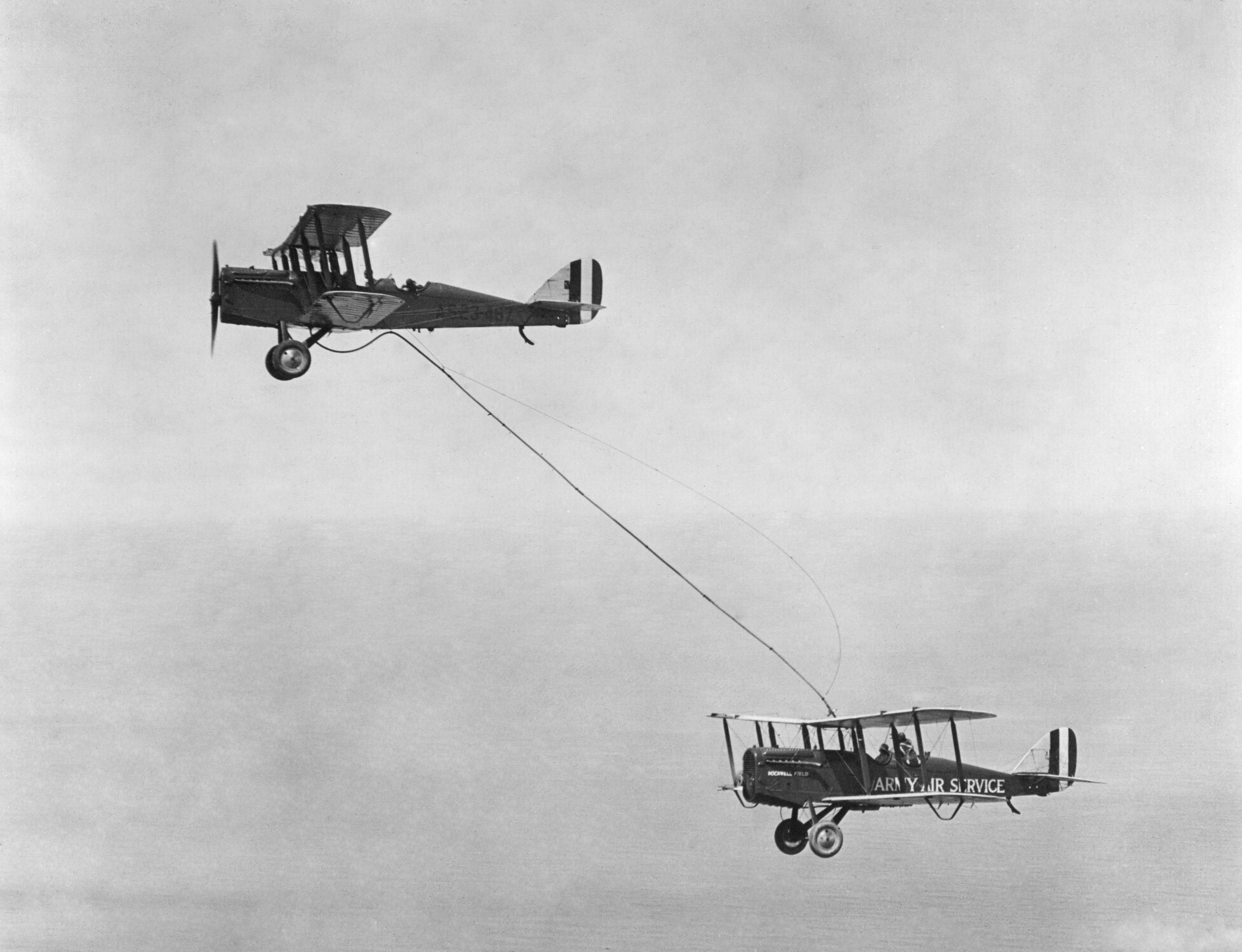
June 27, 1923: Airplane refueled in mid-air for the first time

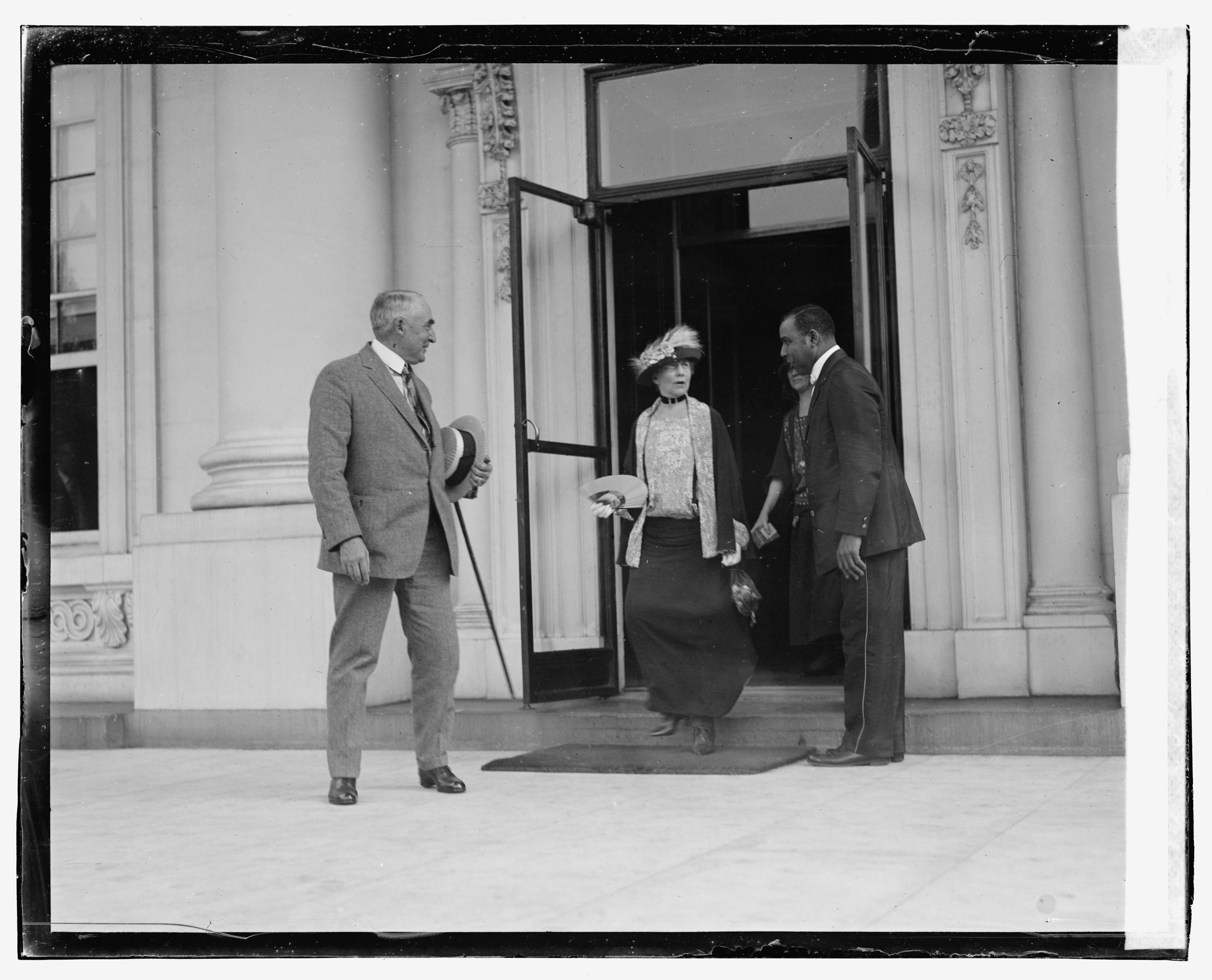
June 20, 1923: U.S. President Harding leaves White House to go on tour, never returns

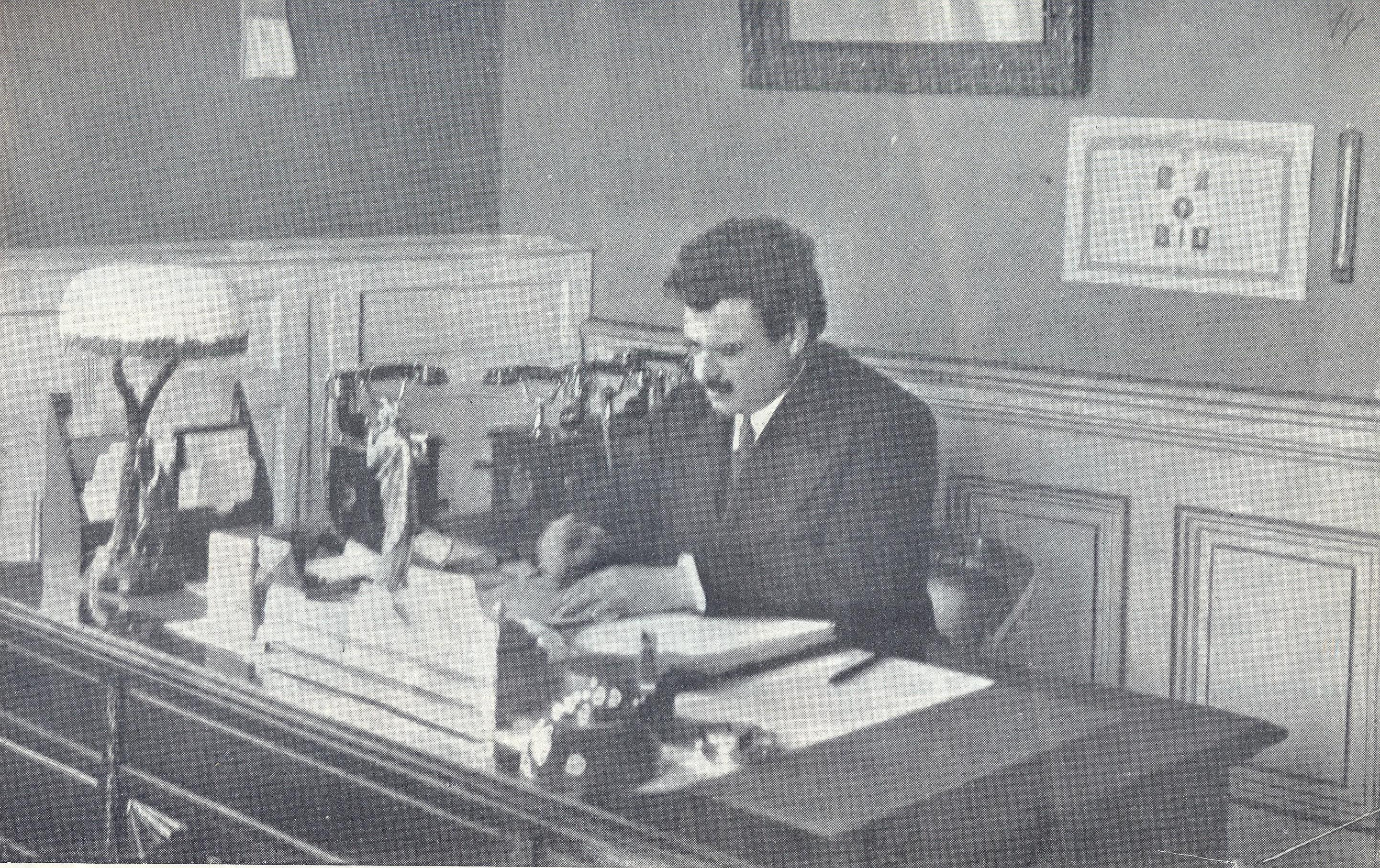
June 9, 1923: Bulgaria's Prime Minister Stamboliyski overthrown

== June 1, 1923 (Friday) ==
- The Albert Roussel opera Padmâvatî was first performed at the Paris Opéra.
- Mabel Philipson, a stage actress who had been better known as Mabel Russell, became the third woman in British history to be elected to the House of Commons. Her husband, Hilton Philipson, had won the Berwick-upon-Tweed constituency in the 1922 general election, but the result had been overturned following charges of corruption against him. Mrs. Philipson took her seat on June 7.
- The U.S. state of New York became the first to repeal enforcement of the nationwide prohibition of the sale of alcohol, as Governor Alfred E. Smith signed the Mullen-Gage bill repealing the law.

== June 2, 1923 (Saturday) ==
- French boxer Eugène Criqui knocked out Johnny Kilbane in the sixth round at the Polo Grounds in New York City to win the World Featherweight Title. Babe Ruth hurried over from Yankee Stadium to attend the bout.
- The Kaufman Act was signed, mandating the electrification of all railroads in New York City by January 1, 1926.

== June 3, 1923 (Sunday) ==
- Voters in Switzerland overwhelmingly rejected restrictions on the production of alcohol, turning down a proposal that would have given the Swiss government an exclusive monopoly on brewing and distilling.
- A commission in New York City released the findings of its investigation into charges that some American history textbooks included anti-American propaganda. The report found eight such textbooks that were seen as pro-British. "Any history which, after 150 years, attempts to teach our children that the War of Independence was an unnecessary war and that it is still a problem as to who was right and who was wrong, should be fed to the furnace and those responsible for those books branded as un-American", commissioner David Hirschfeld said.

== June 4, 1923 (Monday) ==
- The British cargo ship Trevessa foundered in the Indian Ocean while traveling from Australia to Mauritius. While all but ten of the 44 crew were able to escape to lifeboats before the ship sank, sixteen men in one lifeboat spent the next 25 days drifting at sea before they were able to reach land, finally getting to the Mauritius island of Rodrigues on June 29 after a voyage of 2,000 miles (3,200 km).
- The Unitarian Universalist communion service known as the "Flower Communion", created by Norbert Čapek, was performed for the first time. The ceremony took place in a Unitarian church in the Czechoslovak capital of Prague.
- The U.S. Supreme Court decided Meyer v. Nebraska, overturning bans in 20 states against the teaching of languages other than English in school. The case in chief had been brought by Robert T. Meyer, a teacher in a private Lutheran school, who had instructed a 10-year-old child in the German language, and had been consolidated with cases from Iowa and Ohio as well.
- The "Zero Milestone", marking the geographic center of the city of Washington, D.C., as originally designed by Pierre Charles L'Enfant, was dedicated at a spot near the White House at latitude 38°53′42.38736″ N, longitude 77°02′11.57299″ W.
- The musical revue that would bring the Marx Brothers to Broadway, I'll Say She Is, debuted at the Walnut Street Theatre.
- Born:
  - Elizabeth Jolley, English-born Australian writer; as Monica Elizabeth Knight, in Birmingham, England (d. 2007)
  - Dr. Margot Shiner, German-born British pediatrician and gastroenterologist; as Margot Last, in Berlin, Germany (d. 1998)

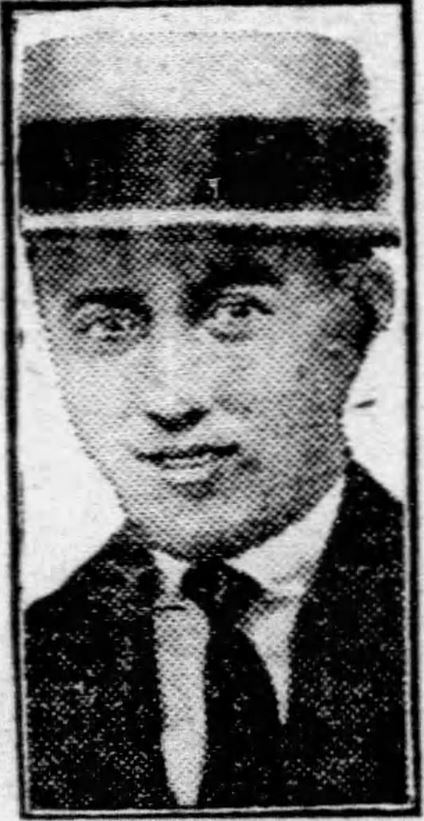
Frank Hayes

- Died:
  - Frank Hayes, 22, American jockey, attained posthumous fame while riding the horse Sweet Kiss to victory at the Belmont Park in New York. Hayes crossed the finish line on Sweet Kiss ahead of everyone for his first, and only, victory in horse racing, then died of a heart attack. Doctors attributed Hayes's death to heart disease, aggravated by his efforts to lose weight in order to reach the required limit for entering the race, and the excitement of the event itself, making Hayes the only person known to have won a horse race after dying. (b. 1901)
  - Filippo Smaldone, 74, Roman Catholic priest canonized in 2006 as a Catholic saint (b. 1848)
  - Juan Soldevila y Romero, 79, Spanish cleric, Roman Catholic Archbishop of Zaragoza, who had been elevated to the rank of cardinal by the Pope, was assassinated by gunmen who also killed his chauffeur. Cardinal Soldevila was seated in his car, preparing to visit a monastery, when members of the terrorist group Los Solidarios fired multiple gunshots into the vehicle. (b. 1843)

== June 5, 1923 (Tuesday) ==
- Germany asked for a new reparations conference. The proposal, as presented by Chancellor Wilhelm Cuno, asked for a new arrangement in which Germany would transfer materials worth 2.5 billion gold marks over the next five years while rebuilding the nation's economy and would then pay 1.5 billion gold marks every year beginning in 1928.
- In an address in Washington D.C. to open the national convention of the Shriners (at the time still called the "Ancient Arabic Order of the Nobles of the Mystic Shrine"), U.S. President Warren G. Harding delivered what was seen by reporters as a thinly veiled criticism of the Ku Klux Klan, which had recently held a large demonstration in nearby Maryland, though not mentioning the Klan by name. "Secret fraternity is one thing," Harding said. "Secret conspiracy is another. In the very naturalness of association, men band together for mischief, to exert misguided zeal, to vent unreasoning malice, to undermine our institutions. This isn't fraternity. This is conspiracy. This isn't associated with uplift; it is organized destruction. This is not brotherhood; it is the discord of disloyalty and a danger to the Republic."
- The White House released President Harding's "Voyage of Understanding", a 19-stop speaking tour by train that would travel to 10 western states, as well as the Canadian province of British Columbia and (by ship) the U.S. territory of Alaska, starting on June 20 and continuing until August 4, after which the presidential train was scheduled to take him back to Washington.
- The tiny nation of San Marino established the Order of Saint Agatha for charitable work in the service of the republic.
- Born: George Montague, British gay rights activist; in Hackney, London (d. 2022)

== June 6, 1923 (Wednesday) ==
- The Russian Civil War saw its last major battle as the Soviet Army defeated the remnants of the White Army near Okhotsk.
- France and Belgium released a joint statement saying that Germany's request would not be considered until passive resistance in the Ruhr ended.
- Papyrus won the Epsom Derby, the United Kingdom's premier thoroughbred horse race. Edgar Wallace became the first British radio sports reporter when he reported on the Derby for the British Broadcasting Company.
- Women who were at least 25 and had a grammar school-level education. were granted the right to vote in local elections in Italy.
- The U.S. Army dirigible TC-1, which had set a dirigible airspeed record of 74 miles per hour (119 km/h) earlier in the year and was the largest American airship, was destroyed at Wilbur Wright Field in Dayton, Ohio during a severe electrical storm. Though not struck by lightning, the hydrogen-filled bag was "highly charged with electricity" when winds blew it into contact with a steel mooring tower. A U.S. Army sergeant and a civilian from the Goodyear Rubber Company were injured after having to jump to the ground from an altitude of 40 feet (12 m) while escaping the fire.
- Born:
  - Joe Hyams, American syndicated gossip columnist and author; in Cambridge, Massachusetts (d. 2008)
  - Jean Pouliot, Canadian broadcasting magnate and founder of the Télé-Capitale broadcasting company and the TVA network, the first French language TV network in Canada; in Quebec City, Quebec, Canada (d. 2004)

== June 7, 1923 (Thursday) ==
- King George V of the United Kingdom granted a charter of incorporation to the Federation of British Industries.
- Four radio stations in the United States made a simultaneous broadcast of a live program that was from New York City to Chicago and by hundreds of thousands of listeners in North America, making a performance from Carnegie Hall the most listened to broadcast up to that time. Persons tuning in to WEAF (New York City), KDKA (Pittsburgh), KYW (Chicago) or WGY (Schenectady, New York) heard the singing of Metropolitan Opera soprano Anna Case, followed by a speech by Julius H. Barnes, president of the United States Chamber of Commerce, after the radio event was set up for the annual convention of the National Electric Light Association.
- Born: Kinuko Emi, Japanese modern art and abstract painter; as Kinuko Ogino, in Akashi, Hyōgo Prefecture, Empire of Japan (d. 2015)

== June 8, 1923 (Friday) ==
- The British House of Commons passed a bill giving women the right to divorce their husbands on the grounds of infidelity, without having to prove cruelty or desertion.
- The Craven Holding Corporation purchased the trademark for Pepsi-Cola, including the secret manufacturing process, from the soft drink's inventor, Caleb Bradham, for $30,000. Bradham had filed for bankruptcy eight days earlier, on May 31, after having marketed the beverage since 1893.
- Bryce Canyon National Park in Utah was designated as a U.S. national monument by proclamation of U.S. President Warren G. Harding.
- Died:
  - Ambroise-Dydime Lépine, 83, Canadian Métis Indian leader in the Red River Rebellion of 1869 and 1870 (b. 1840)
  - Herbert Jenkins, 47, British book publisher (b. 1876)

== June 9, 1923 (Saturday) ==
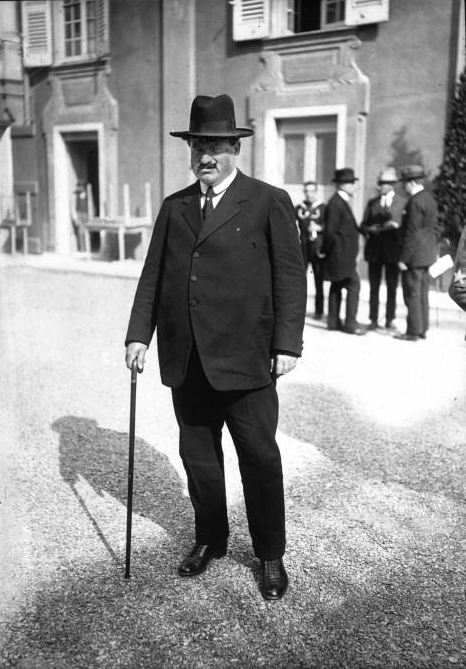
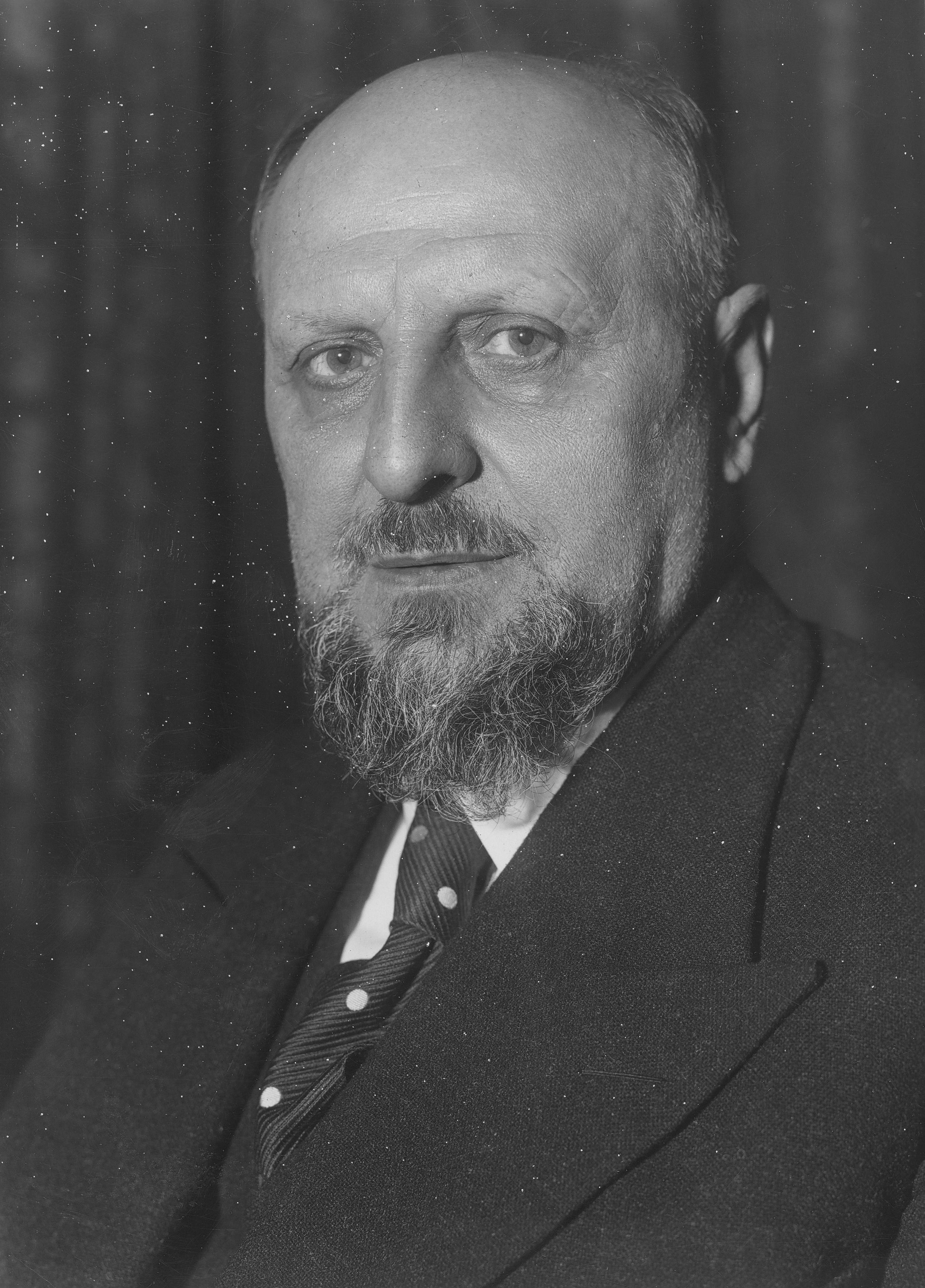
Stamboliyski and Tsankov
- The government of Bulgaria's Prime Minister Aleksandar Stamboliyski was toppled in a bloodless coup led by General Ivan Valkov's Vonnyat Soyuz, a private organization of reserve officers. Stamboliyski had been vacationing in his home village of Slavovitsa and had returned by train to the capital, Sofia, the night before and was detained at the station by troops. Aleksandar Tsankov, a professor of political science at Sofia University, was installed as the new Prime Minister with the approval of Bulgaria's king, Tsar Boris III. Stamboliyski, who had survived an assassination attempt by the Internal Macedonian Revolutionary Organization (IMRO) on February 2, fled back to Slavovitsa, where he was arrested by his former bodyguards.
- Brink's unveiled its first armored security vans.
- Australia's national soccer football team hosted its first international game, after having played three games in New Zealand in 1922. The 2 to 1 win against New Zealand took place at Brisbane Cricket Ground before 7,000 people.
- The Belmont amusement park opened in Montreal, Quebec, Canada. It would close in 1983.
- Died: Princess Helena of the United Kingdom, 77 (b. 1846)

== June 10, 1923 (Sunday) ==
- Electricity was introduced to Mandatory Palestine (the future location of Israel) as the Jaffa Electric Company went online and lit streetlights on the main street of Tel Aviv.
- Fishermen at Long Key, Florida reported harpooning a 20,000 pound sea monster. They said it continued to fight even after fifty rounds of ammunition had been fired into it.
- The film The Shock, starring Lon Chaney, was released.
- Hamburger SV defeated SC Union 06 Oberschöneweide (now 1. FC Union Berlin), 3 to 0, to win the soccer football championship of Germany and the Viktoria trophy. The playoff had been contested by seven teams that had won regional championships, with Hamburger SV being the Northern German champion and Oberschöneweide bweing the Brandenburg state champion.
- Born:
  - Robert Maxwell, Czechoslovak-born British publishing entrepreneur who controlled Pergamon Press, Macmillan Publishers and Mirror Group Newspapers and embezzled funds from the companies; as Ján Ludvík Hoch, in Slatinské Doly, Czechoslovakia (present-day Solotvyno, Ukraine) (d. 1991)
  - Ivan Kabalin, highly decorated Soviet Army officer; in Aleksandrovka, Chuvash oblast, Russian SFSR (d. 1982)
- Died: Pierre Loti, 73, French novelist known for Ramuntcho and Pêcheur d'Islande (An Iceland Fisherman) (b. 1850)

== June 11, 1923 (Monday) ==
- The U.S. Supreme Court decided Rindge Co. v. County of Los Angeles, holding that a local government could use its power of eminent domain to take land from a private landowner for the specific purpose of building a scenic highway, despite the fact that a highway could be built elsewhere on land within the government's jurisdiction. Writing the opinion on behalf of a unanimous (8 to 0) court, Justice Edward T. Sanford wrote, "Public uses are not limited, in the modern view, to matters of mere business necessity and ordinary convenience, but may extend to matters of public health, recreation and enjoyment. Thus, the condemnation of lands for public parks is now universally recognized as a taking for public use. A road need not be for a purpose of business to create a public exigency; air, exercise and recreation are important to the general health and welfare; pleasure travel may be accommodated as well as business travel; and highways may be condemned to places of pleasing natural scenery."
- Born:
  - Dr. Eric J. Trimmer, English general practitioner and medical writer known for The Natural History of Quackery and for a subsequent series of books for the general public about health and medical science; in London, England (d. 1998)
  - Özdemir Asaf, Turkish poet; in Ankara, Turkey (d. 1981)

== June 12, 1923 (Tuesday) ==
- The last eight of the hostages of the Lincheng Outrage, the May 5 seizure of 300 passengers from an express train, were freed after Shanghai mob boss Du Yuesheng of the "Green Gang" delivered an $85,000 ransom to Sun Meiyao and the Shandong Outlaws, equivalent to almost $1.5 million a century later.
- General Feng Yuxiang issued an ultimatum to Chinese President Li Yuanhong stating that his troops would enter Beijing if Li did not resign.
- Lithuanian-born American stage magician Horace Goldin was awarded U.S. patent 1,458,575 for creating the famous "sawing a woman in half" illusion, blocking other magicians from performing the same trick for the next 17 years, but revealing the secret to other people.
- Born: Richard Lehman, U.S. presidential adviser who developed the top secret President's Daily Brief for President Kennedy while at the CIA, Deputy Director of Central Intelligence 1976 to 1977 and Chairman of the National Intelligence Council 1979 to 1981; in St. Louis (d. 2007)

== June 13, 1923 (Wednesday) ==
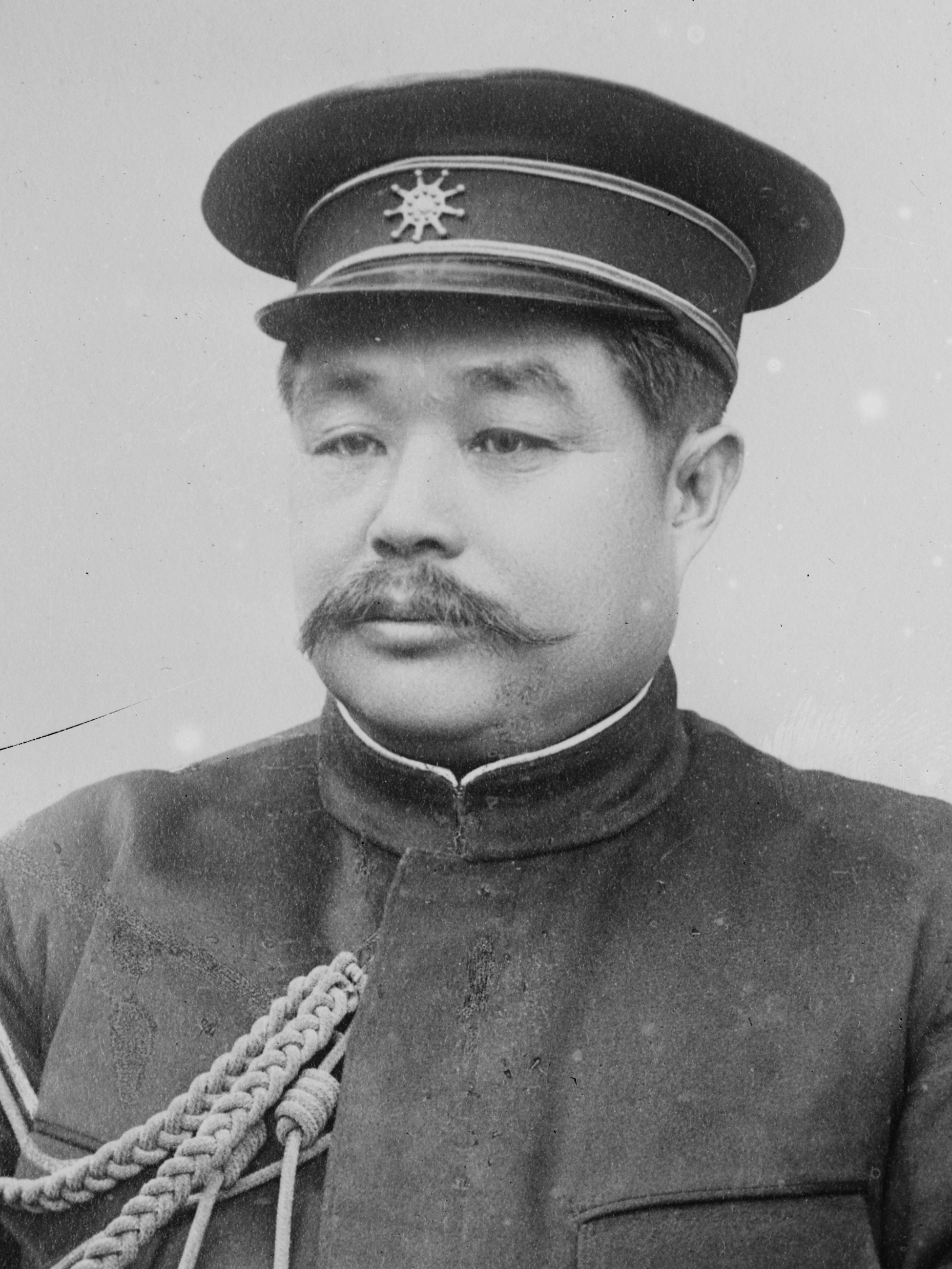
President Li

- Chinese President Li Yuanhong was captured at the railway station in Tientsin when troops surrounded the train in which he was fleeing from Beijing. Orders to stop the train came directly from the Governor of Zhili province, Wang Chengbin. Li won his freedom the next day by sending a message to Beijing, by telegram, resigning his office and turning over authority to the cabinet.
- The value of the German mark fell further to an exchange rate of 100,000 marks to the U.S. dollar. Prior to World War One, the exchange rate had been 4.20 marks to a U.S. dollar. By June 1923, the rate was 81,000 marks to a dollar.
- The Igor Stravinsky ballet Les noces was given its first performance, premiering in Paris and presented by the Ballets Russes to choreography by Bronislava Nijinska.

== June 14, 1923 (Thursday) ==
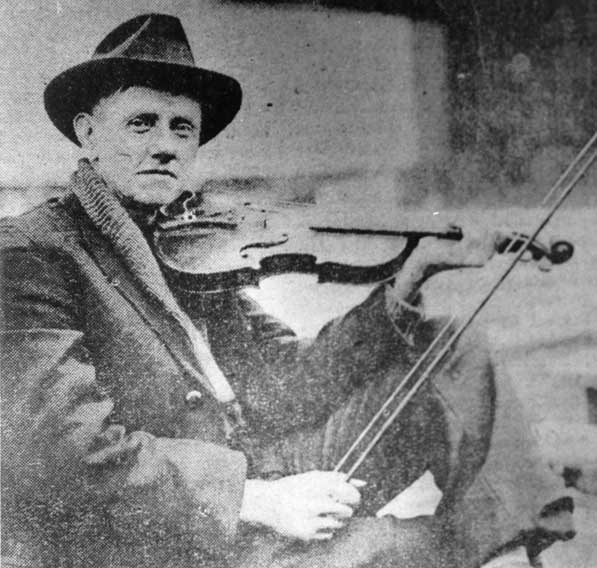
Carson

- The first commercial recording of a country music ballad with lyrics was made by Fiddlin' John Carson as he sang "The Little Old Log Cabin in the Lane" while playing a fiddle at the studios of Okeh Records.
- Aleksandar Stamboliyski, who had been overthrown as Prime Minister of Bulgaria five days earlier, was tortured and murdered by agents of the Internal Macedonian Revolutionary Organization (IMRO). His captors cut off his right hand in retaliation for secretly signing the Treaty of Niš with Yugoslavia on March 23.
- Gao Lingwei became acting President of the Republic of China.
- A tugboat towed the remains of the Florida "sea monster", found on June 10 near Long Key, to Key West. The monster was identified as a whale shark.
- Born: Judith Kerr, German-born British children's author and illustrator; as Anna Judith Gertrud Helene Kerr, in Berlin, Germany (d. 2019)
- Died: Sir Mansfield Smith-Cumming, 64, British Royal Navy officer who served as the first chief of the Secret Intelligence Service, MI-6 (b. 1859)

== June 15, 1923 (Friday) ==
- The American Relief Administration (ARA) halted all further aid to the Soviet Union after discovering that the Soviets were exporting grain to other nations, despite an ongoing famine that the ARA had been working to alleviate.
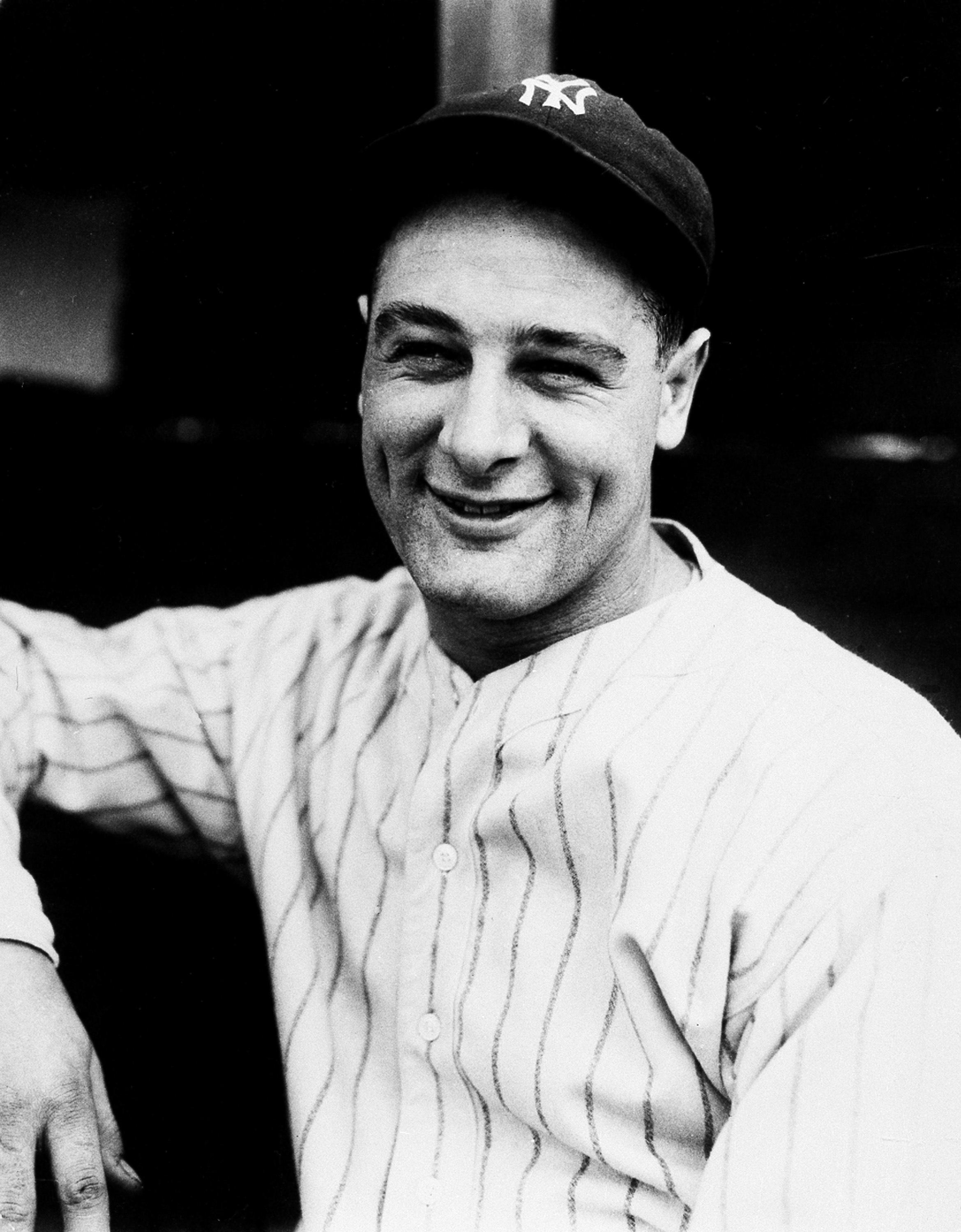
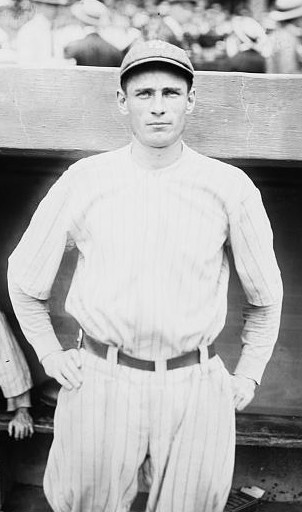
Lou Gehrig and Wally Pipp
- Arthur Havers of England won the British Open golf tournament by one stroke, defeating Walter Hagen of the U.S. in 72-holes. The tournament was so close that the first four finishers, Havers, Hagen, Macdonald Smith and Joe Kirkwood, finished at 295, 296, 297 and 298 respectively.
- Lou Gehrig, who had been a college baseball sensation at New York City's Columbia University, made his major league baseball debut, entering a game for the New York Yankees in a 10 to 0 win over the St. Louis Browns as a ninth-inning defensive substitute at first base and taking over for Wally Pipp.
- Born:
  - Dr. David Morley, British pediatrician and humanitarian who developed low cost methods for the prevention and treatment of illness in Nigeria and other nations in Africa; in Rothwell, Northamptonshire, England (d. 2009)
  - Koentjaraningrat, Indonesian anthropologist; in Yogyakarta, Dutch East Indies (present-day Indonesia) (d. 1999)
  - Johnny Most, American sports announcer; in New York City (d. 1993)

== June 16, 1923 (Saturday) ==
- The Yakut Revolt, the last resistance by the White Army to the Soviet Union in the Russian Civil War, ended as the remaining 333 officers and soldiers of the White Army surrendered the port town of Ayan to the Red Army.
- The French occupied Dortmund railway station, leaving only one line leading from the Ruhr into unoccupied Germany.
- Rioting broke out in Brandenburg in Germany over the rapidly increasing prices of goods due to hyperinflation.
- A rally of the Ku Klux Klan white supremacist group attracted 200,000 people in Kokomo, Indiana.
- The prohibition of the manufacture and sale of alcohol went into effect in Turkey.
- Born: Joseph Colombo, American mob boss who led New York's Colombo crime family and created the Italian-American Civil Rights League advocacy group; in New York City (d. 1978)
- Died: Kavi Kant, 55, Indian Gujarati language poet and playwright (b. 1867)

== June 17, 1923 (Sunday) ==
- Northern Ireland had its first "dry Sunday", prohibiting alcohol sales on that day. Towns just across the border in the Irish Free State were swamped with visitors who crossed over to drink.
- Mount Etna erupted in Sicily with several loud explosions.
- The anti-drug film Human Wreckage, produced by Dorothy Davenport, widow of Wallace Reid, was released by Film Booking Offices of America. When the film reached New York, a critic for The New York Times, wrote "It is a story that might appeal to an audience of those who need narcotics, but to the average person who has a night off and goes to the theatre for entertainment it is not pleasing," and added that the story "wanders along until it becomes tiresome, and the dramatic climax is spoiled."
- The Stan Laurel comedy film Pick and Shovel was released. Laurel's future partner, Oliver Hardy, was in the film The Midnight Cabaret at the same time.
- Born:
  - Elroy Hirsch, American professional football halfback and inductee to both the Pro Football Hall of Fame and the Pro Football Hall of Fame; in Wausau, Wisconsin (d. 2004)
  - Hasan Basry, Indonesian Army General military in the Indonesian National Revolution of independence; in Kandangan, Borneo, Dutch East Indies (present-day Indonesia) (d. 1984)
  - Sukh Dev, Indian organic chemist and inventor; in Chakwal, Punjab Province, British India (present-day Pakistan) (d. 2024)

== June 18, 1923 (Monday) ==
- On the Italian island of Sicily, several villages built on the side of Mount Etna— specifically, Piccilo, Pallamelata and Ferro— were destroyed by lava, but no casualties were reported as residents had time to evacuate.
- Pancho Villa, a diminutive (5'1" or 154 cm) Philippine boxer whose real name was Francisco Guilledo, won the world flyweight championship when he knocked out the titleholder, Welsh boxer Jimmy Wilde, in the seventh round before 40,000 spectators at the Polo Grounds in New York City.
- Speculation about Henry Ford running for president ended when he was quoted as saying, "I am much too occupied with my own affairs to become the next president and I do not intend to run."
- Political leader Marcus Garvey was found guilty of mail fraud for using the U.S. mail to sell stock in the bankrupt Black Star Line.
- Died:
  - Vasili Komaroff, 52, Soviet Russian serial killer who murdered at least 33 people over a two year period, was executed by firing squad with his wife and accomplice Sofya Komaroff (b. 1871)
  - Walter Flanders, 52, American automobile and motorcycle manufacturer, died three days after being seriously injured in a car accident (b. 1871)
  - Hristo Smirnenski, 24, Bulgarian poet, died of tuberculosis (b. 1898)

== June 19, 1923 (Tuesday) ==
- Britain and the United States signed an agreement on Britain's war debt obligations.
- Lava from Mount Etna reached the outskirts of Linguaglossa and Castiglione. The flow of lava from the volcano stopped by June 21.
- The popular U.S. newspaper comic strip Moon Mullins, created by Frank Willard, made its debut. A feature of the Chicago Tribune and New York's Daily News, Moon Mullins would be syndicated in 350 papers at its height and would run until June 2, 1991.
- Died: Shō Shō, 34, member of Japan's House of Peers as the Marquess of the Ryukyu Islands, died from appendicitis. (b. 1888). The Marquess had been the leader of the House of Shō since 1920 as the eldest son of Shō Ten, the former Crown Prince of the Ryukyu Kingdom.

== June 20, 1923 (Wednesday) ==
- U.S. President Warren G. Harding left Washington D.C. for the last time, and would never return. President Harding embarked on a cross-country speaking tour which he called the "Voyage of Understanding", set to take him through much of the 48 U.S. states and as far west as the U.S. Territory of Alaska.
- President Harding relinquished control of his newspaper, The Marion Star, which he had owned and operated while in Marion, Ohio.
- Born: Bjørn Watt-Boolsen, Danish film actor; in Rudkøbing, Denmark (d. 1998)
- Died: Sumner Increase Kimball, 88, U.S. government official who organized the United States Life-Saving Service (b. 1834)

== June 21, 1923 (Thursday) ==
- On the first stop of his western tour, President Harding gave a speech in St. Louis reiterating his advocacy for American participation in the World Court but not the League of Nations. The speech was carried live by three radio stations, making Harding the first president to be heard by a million people simultaneously. During the day, the presidential train had made whistle stops in Indiana at the towns of Washington, Seymour and Vincennes, and in Illinois at Olney and Salem.
- Marcus Garvey was sentenced to five years in prison for mail fraud.
- William S. Silkworth was forced to resign as president of the Consolidated Stock Exchange of New York, a rival to the New York Stock Exchange, after a criminal investigation discovered irregularities in his personal finances. The Consolidated exchange soon became the subject of investigation, and would cease operations three years later.
- Born: Richard Kinney, American Deafblind educator and school administrator, the third Deafblind person in the U.S. to graduate from college, served as the president of the Hadley School for the Blind; in East Sparta, Ohio (d. 1979)

== June 22, 1923 (Friday) ==
- The United Kingdom enacted the Universities of Oxford and Cambridge Act 1923, granting each of the two universities £100,000 annually.
- The first major feature film in Thailand, Nang Sao Suwan (Miss Suwanna of Siam), had its premiere in a theater in Nakhon Si Thammarat, and was seen a few days later in Bangkok in the Phatthanakon Cinematograph and in the Hong Kong Cinema Hall. The 8-reel silent film was distributed in the United States by Universal Studios.
- Born: Oba Erediauwa I, Nigerian civil servant, and ceremonial ruler of the Benin Empire and the Edo people in the Edo State of Nigeria from 1979 until his death in 2016; as Solomon Akenzua, in Benin City, British Nigeria (d. 2016)

== June 23, 1923 (Saturday) ==
- American sculptor Gutzon Borglum began carving the Stone Mountain Memorial bas-relief sculpture and would complete the first stage, a large image of Robert E. Lee, in time for an unveiling on January 19, 1924.
- Ronald McNeill, spokesperson for the British Foreign Secretary, told an audience in Sturry that the occupation of the Ruhr threatened to bring about the complete collapse of Germany, which would end all hope of ever recovering reparations payments.
- Gambhirsinhji Himmatsinhji, a 9-year-old prince, became the ruler of the princely state of Malpur upon the death of his father Dipsinhji II. He was the nominal ruler of the small state within the Bombay Province of British India until Malpur's accession to the Indian Union in 1949 as part of the state of Gujarat.
- Born:
  - Anna Chennault, Chinese-born American journalist and politician; as Chan Sheng Mai, in Beijing, Republic of China (d. 2018)
  - Giuseppina Tuissi, Italian resistance fighter in World War II; in Abbiategrasso, Kingdom of Italy (disappeared, 1945)
  - Elroy Schwartz, American television screenwriter and comedian known for authoring episodes of sitcoms created by his older brother, Sherwood Schwartz; in Passaic, New Jersey (d. 2013)
  - George Russell, American jazz composer; in Cincinnati (d. 2009)
- Died:
  - Sodnomyn Damdinbazar, 48 or 49, Mongolian tulku, Prime Minister of Mongolia since March, 1922 (b. 1874)
  - Jean Casale, 29, French flying ace with 13 victories in World War I, was killed in the test flight of the four-engine Blériot 115 biplane. (b. 1893)

== June 24, 1923 (Sunday) ==
- The Nigerian National Democratic Party, the first political party in what was then the British African colony of Nigeria, was founded by Herbert Macaulay, Thomas H. Jackson, Crispin Adeniyi-Jones, Eric Moore and Egerton Shyngle to lobby for independence.
- The French Chamber of Deputies debated whether to give the colony of the French West Indies to the United States as payment of war debt. Prime Minister Raymond Poincaré said, "I never would permit such a proposal to be officially made to the French government."
- Lithuania's national soccer football team played its first international game, a 0 to 5 loss to Estonia at Kaunas.
- Top hats, which had been out of fashion in Paris since the beginning of the war in 1914, made a sudden comeback among French men.
- Born: Cesare Romiti, Italian businessman, chairman of the board of Fiat Motor Company from 1996 to 1998; in Rome (d. 2020)
- Died: Edith Södergran, 31, Finnish poet who wrote in Swedish (b. 1892)

== June 25, 1923 (Monday) ==
- The Canadian province of Ontario held a general election in which the Progressive Conservative Party, led by Howard Ferguson, received a majority, defeating the incumbent Premier Charles Drury and the United Farmers of Ontario party, which had campaigned on a platform of prohibiting the sale of liquor in Ontario.
- Seven people were killed on Atlantic Avenue in the Brooklyn borough of New York City, and 70 injured, when an elevated train derailed and the locomotive and two railroad cars fell onto automobiles 35 feet (11 m) below. The disaster, the worst in Brooklyn since the Malbone Street wreck of November 1, 1918 (which killed 91 people), happened when a bogie (also called a "truck", a set of the axle and wheels) from one of the trains broke off and smashed into the second car of the train.
- Born:
  - Jamshid Amouzegar, Iranian economist and politician, served as the Prime Minister of Iran from 1977 to 1978; in Tehran (d. 2016)
  - Sam Francis, American painter and printmaker; in San Mateo, California (d. 1994)

== June 26, 1923 (Tuesday) ==
- Prime Minister Stanley Baldwin announced that Britain would add 34 squadrons to its air force to give the country a total of 52. This was still smaller than France's air force.
- Okmulgee County, Oklahoma was put under martial law by Governor Jack C. Walton to investigate Ku Klux Klan activity.
- A large fire broke out at night in the northwest corner of the Forbidden City.
- Died:
  - Edith Smith, 46, the first female police officer in the United Kingdom with full power of arrest, died of a morphine overdose. (b. 1876)
  - Oskar von Chelius, 63, Prussian Army officer and classical music composer (b. 1859)

== June 27, 1923 (Wednesday) ==
- The first refueling of an airplane in flight was accomplished, as U.S. Army Air Service Captain Lowell Smith and his co-pilot, Lieutenant John P. Richter, refilled the fuel tank of their Airco DH.4 biplane from a hose lowered from another DH.4 plane. The two planes took off and landed from Rockwell Field in San Diego, California. The successful refueling made easier the prospect of an airplane staying aloft longer without running out of fuel.
- Pope Pius XI condemned the occupation of the Ruhr, taken by French and Belgian troops in Germany to secure payment of reparations. A letter was publicized in which he warned that it could lead to the "final ruin of Europe" and recommended that the reparations issue be determined by a panel of impartial judges.
- A fire in Beijing's Forbidden City destroyed the treasure hall and the imperial gardens.
- Four Scottish members of the Labour Party were suspended from the House of Commons when a debate over funding cuts at the Scottish Health Board became unruly. The fighting started when James Maxton said that the cuts directly caused the death of hundreds of children and called Sir Frederick Banbury a murderer.
- The House of Commons of Canada voted unanimously to grant Dr. Frederick Banting a lifetime annuity of $7,500 to continue his medical research.
- Nikola Pašić, the Prime Minister of Yugoslavia, was slightly wounded in an assassination attempt in Belgrade. A Serbian bank employee, Millutone Raic, fired six shots as Pašić was leaving parliament. Pašić was able to enter his limousine and dropped to the floor, and sustained an injury to his hand.
- Born:
  - Miriam Boulotchnik London, American sociologist; in Philadelphia (d. 2011)
  - Tesfaye Sahlu, Ethiopian comedian and children's author; in Kedu, Bale Province (d. 2017)
  - Gus Zernial, American professional baseball player, led the American League in home runs and runs batted in in 1951; in Beaumont, Texas (d. 2011)

== June 28, 1923 (Thursday) ==
- The first general elections in Turkey's history were held to pick the secondary electors in each precinct who, in turn, would elect the candidates for the 333 seats of the Grand National Assembly of Turkey. Although all candidates were approved by the sole legal political party in the nation, the Republican People's Party, there was no limit on the number of candidates in a constituency.
- Firearms inventor John Browning filed his patent application for his Browning Hi-Power semi-automatic pistol, with the name "high power" being a reference to its larger capacity, an unprecedented 13-round magazine. Browning would die in 1926 before the granting in 1927 of U.S. patent no. 648,275.
- From his hospital bed in Oklahoma City, George Bigheart, one of the Osage Indian oil millionaires called Pawhuska, Oklahoma lawyer W. Watkins Vaughan and asked him to come to the hospital for an urgent meeting. Bigheart's physicians suspected that he had been poisoned, and Bigheart provided Vaughn with information about documents that would identify a murder suspect. Vaughan boarded a train that evening to return to Pawhuska, but never arrived home. Bigheart succumbed the next day, and Vaughn's body was found afterward beside the railroad tracks near the town of Pershing.
- Born:
  - Daniil Khrabrovitsky, Soviet Russian film director; in Rostov-on-Don, Russian SFSR (d. 1980)
  - Gaye Stewart, Canadian professional ice hockey player; as James Gaye Stewart, in Fort William, Ontario (d. 2010)
- Died: Prince Devawongse Varoprakar, 64, Siamese prince and diplomat who served as the Foreign Minister of the Kingdom of Siam from 1885 until his death, died of sepsis. (b. 1858)

== June 29, 1923 (Friday) ==
- Juan Crisóstomo Gómez, Vice President of Venezuela, Governor of the Caracas Federal District and the younger brother of President Juan Vicente Gómez, was assassinated in his room at the presidential residence in Caracas, the Miraflores Palace.
- French Prime Minister Raymond Poincaré made a speech in the French Senate indirectly responding to the pope's letter by explaining that "the only screw that we have on Germany is her desire to recover the Ruhr. We have no thought of annexation, and we energetically refute all accusations of imperialism. France does not wish to confiscate the Ruhr. We will keep it, however, until Germany has paid her debt." Poincaré also called the resistance movement in the Ruhr "active, insidious and criminal."
- Died: Gustave Kerker, 66, German composer, died from apoplexy. (b. 1857)

== June 30, 1923 (Saturday) ==
- A time bomb killed 8 Belgian soldiers and two German civilians, when it exploded on a Belgian troop train just as the cars were crossing over the Hochfeld railway bridge in the occupied Ruhr region of Germany. Eight. Another 43 people were injured. The bomb had been placed in a toilet of the car, which was transporting the Belgian soldiers home while they were on leave. The bridge itself was wrecked, and the mayor of Hochfeld and 12 other local officials were arrested by occupation forces as suspects in the crime.
