= Trimmer =

Trimmer may refer to:

- Trimmer (construction), beam used in construction
- Trimmer (electronics), small electrical component
- Trimmer (gardening), gardening power tool
- Trimmer (surname)
- Trimmer, California, community in Fresno County
- Laminate trimmer, wood-working tool
- Trimmer - a book trimming machine
- Coal trimmer, also known as a trimmer, a person who distributes coal on a steam ship
- Hair clipper
- George Savile, 1st Marquess of Halifax, author of The Character of a Trimmer, which was and is often held to describe his own conduct - and therefore he has "the Trimmer" as a nickname

== See also ==
- Trimer (disambiguation)
- Trim (disambiguation)
