= Trim =

Trim or TRIM may refer to:

== Cutting ==
- Cutting or trimming small pieces off something to remove them
  - Book trimming, a stage of the publishing process
  - Pruning, trimming as a form of pruning often used on trees

== Decoration ==
- Trim (sewing), ornaments applied to clothing or other textiles
- Hatmaking § Types, trimmings, ornaments fastened to women's hats
- Trim package, a set of cosmetic embellishments to a car or other vehicle
- Trim, a kind of decorative molding, typically around an opening

== Places ==
- Trim, County Meath, a town in Ireland
  - Trim Castle, a castle in the town
- Trim station, a bus station in Ottawa, Canada
- Trim Road, Ottawa, Canada

== Science and technology ==
- HP TRIM Records Management System, computer software
- Trim (computing), a solid-state drive erasure optimization command
- Trimming (computer programming), using a computer command to trim whitespace from the ends of text
- Transport of ions in matter, a computer program
- Tripartite motif family, a protein family
- Trim, adjustment of an electronic trimmer
- Transfusion-related immunomodulation, a potential adverse effect of blood transfusion

== Transport ==
- Automotive trim level - a feature of a car
- Trim tab, in aircraft and boats, an adjustable surface part of a larger control surface used to maintain a desired orientation
- Trim, adjustment of a sail on a ship or boat
- Trim (sailing ballast), adjustment of sailing ballast
- Trim (ship), the variation from horizontal on the longitudinal axis

== Entertainment ==
- Trim height, the height in a theatre at which a batten is used
- "Trim" (song), by Playboi Carti and Future
- "Trim", a song by Atmosphere from the album Mi Vida Local, 2018
- "Trim", a song by Underworld from the album A Hundred Days Off, 2002
- Trim (rapper) (born 1984), English grime MC from London
- Trim (American rapper) (born 2005), American female MC from South Carolina
- Trimmed, a 1922 film starring Hoot Gibson

== Other uses ==
- Corporal Trim, a fictional character in The Life and Opinions of Tristram Shandy, Gentleman
- Editing
  - Trimming, editing a posting style in online discourse
- Trim (cat), Matthew Flinders' cat, the first feline to circumnavigate Australia
- Trade Related Investment Measures, rules of the World Trade Organization

== People with the surname ==
- Albert Trim (1875-1954), Australian rules footballer
- Andrew Trim (born 1968), Australian Olympic athlete
- David Trim (born 1969), Indian historian
- John Trim (cricketer) (1915-1960), West Indian cricketer
- John Trim (linguist) (1924-2013), English linguist
- Judith Trim (1943-2001), English studio potter
- Kibwe Trim (born 1984), Trinidad and Tobago businessman and former basketball player
- Michael Trim (television producer) (born 1945), American cinematographer
- Mike Trim (born 1945), English artist
- Roshanna Trim, Barbadian politician
- Ted Trim (1907-1989), Australian rules footballer

== See also ==
- Trimmed mean, in statistics
- Trimmed estimator, in statistics
- Trimmer (disambiguation)
