= List of shipwrecks in May 1923 =

The list of shipwrecks in May 1923 includes ships sunk, foundered, grounded, or otherwise lost during May 1923.

== 3 May ==
List of shipwrecks: 3 May 1923
Ship	State	Description
Alioth	United Kingdom	The ship was driven ashore and wrecked in West Bay, Dorset.
Elizabeth Ann Slater	United Kingdom	The cargo ship collided with Teesider (United Kingdom) in the North Sea off Newcastle-upon-Tyne, Northumberland. She was beached at South Shields.

== 4 May ==
List of shipwrecks: 4 May 1923
Ship	State	Description
Kissho Maru	Japan	The cargo ship collided with Seikai Maru (Japan) at Shimonoseki and sank.

== 7 May ==
List of shipwrecks: 7 May 1923
Ship	State	Description
Roxane	Sweden	The car ship collided with Harald (Germany) in the North Sea off the Elbe 1 Lightship (Germany) and sank. Her crew were rescued.

== 9 May ==
List of shipwrecks: 9 May 1923
Ship	State	Description
Lake Gebhart	United States	The Design 1093 cargo ship ran aground on the Umatilla Reef off Cape Flattery, Washington. She broke in two and was a total loss.
Manhattan Island	United States	The cargo ship ran aground at Sari Siglar, Turkey. She was refloated on 17 May.
Yugala	Thailand	The cargo ship was severely damaged by fire at Singora with the loss of six crew. She was consequently beached.

== 10 May ==
List of shipwrecks: 10 May 1923
Ship	State	Description
Kitanna	United Kingdom	The cargo ship foundered in the English Channel 32 nautical miles (59 km) north east by north of Alderney, Channel Isles.
Kum Sang	United Kingdom	The passenger ship came ashore near Ango, Philippines (approximately 16°N 120°E). She was refloated on 22 May.

== 14 May ==
List of shipwrecks: 14 May 1923
Ship	State	Description
D'Aosta	Italy	The cargo ship ran aground off Munxar, Malta. She was refloated on 18 May.
David	Panama	The cargo ship collided with Yorba Linda (United States) in the Gulf of Panama 50 nautical miles (93 km) off Panama City and was beached at Bucaro.
Sagama River	United Kingdom	The cargo ship ran aground in the Paraná River, Argentina. She was refloated on 21 May.

== 16 May ==
List of shipwrecks: 16 May 1923
Ship	State	Description
Gul-Djemal	Ottoman Empire	The cargo ship ran aground at Cape Jason. She was refloated on 22 May.
Jan	Denmark	The cargo ship ran aground in the Northumberland Strait. She was refloated on 23 May.
Olga	United States	The 76-gross register ton motor schooner was stranded on a sand bar on the west-central coast of the Territory of Alaska opposite the mouth of Safety Lagoon (64°29′N 164°45′W). During the spring of 1923, she was crushed by ice and then wrecked by a gale.

== 19 May ==
List of shipwrecks: 19 May 1923
Ship	State	Description
Maggie Marshall	United Kingdom	The salvage vessel was wrecked at St. Esprit, Nova Scotia, Canada whilst going to the aid of Cymric Queen (United Kingdom).

== 20 May ==
List of shipwrecks: 20 May 1923
Ship	State	Description
Apex No. 8	United States	While no one was on board, the 32-ton scow was wrecked in Stone Rock Bay (54°45′30″N 132°00′00″W) on the coast of Prince of Wales Island in the Alexander Archipelago in Southeast Alaska after she broke free of her mooring to a dolphin during a gale. She was deemed a total loss.

== 21 May ==
List of shipwrecks: 21 May 1923
Ship	State	Description
Glenburnie	United Kingdom	The cargo ship ran aground at Spot Point, Newfoundland. She was refloated on 24 May.
Marcella	United Kingdom	The schooner foundered in the Atlantic Ocean off Louisburg, Nova Scotia, Canada.
Rosa	United Kingdom	The coaster ran aground at Berwick upon Tweed, Northumberland. She was refloated on 28 May.

== 22 May ==
List of shipwrecks: 22 May 1923
Ship	State	Description
Marvale	United Kingdom	The ocean liner struck the Capr Freel Rock off St. Shott's, Newfoundland and sank. All 436 people on board were rescued.
Shoyei Maru	Japan	The cargo ship ran aground on Shimushu Island, Kuril Islands and was abandoned by her crew.

== 26 May ==
List of shipwrecks: 26 May 1923
Ship	State	Description
HM Gunboat Blackfly	Royal Navy	The Fly-class gunboat collided with a pontoon bridge over the Tigris at Baghdad, Iraq and sank with the loss of six crew.
Precheur	France	The tug foundered in the Atlantic Ocean (48°32′N 7°00′W).

== 27 May ==
List of shipwrecks: 27 May 1923
Ship	State	Description
Baron Vernon	United Kingdom	The cargo ship collided with Metagama (United Kingdom): in the River Clyde at Dumbarton, West Dunbartonshire and was beached. She subsequently sank, but was refloated in late July 1924.

== 29 May ==
List of shipwrecks: 29 May 1923
Ship	State	Description
Lady Shea	United Kingdom	The schooner sprang a leak and sank off Port Maria, Jamaica.
Waterway	United Kingdom	The cargo ship capsized at Nantes, Loire-Atlantique.

== 31 May ==
List of shipwrecks: 31 May 1923
Ship	State	Description
Ranan Maru	Japan	The cargo liner ran aground at Qingdao, China. All passengers and crew were rescued. She was refloated on 5 June.
