= Trimer =

Trimer may refer to:

- Trimer (chemistry), a reaction product composed of three identical molecules
- Protein trimer, a compound of three macromolecules non-covalently bound
- Efimov trimer, a weakly bound quantum mechanical state of three identical particles
- Trimer, Ille-et-Vilaine, a commune in France

== See also ==
- Trimery (botany), having three parts in a distinct whorl of a plant structure
- Trimerus, Latin name of the Tremiti Islands, Italy
- tri, a prefix
- -mer, an affix
- Trimmer (disambiguation)
