= List of shipwrecks in June 1923 =

The list of shipwrecks in June 1923 includes ships sunk, foundered, grounded, or otherwise lost during June 1923.

== 1 June ==
List of shipwrecks: 1 June 1923
Ship	State	Description
Shoyei Maru	Japan	The cargo ship was wrecked on the Kamchatka Peninsula, Soviet Union.

== 3 June ==
List of shipwrecks: 3 June 1923
Ship	State	Description
Graphic	United Kingdom	The passenger ship collided with Balsam (United States) in Belfast Lough and sank off Carrickfergus, County Antrim. All 120 people on board were rescued. She was refloated on 24 June.

== 4 June ==
List of shipwrecks: 4 June 1923
Ship	State	Description
Trevessa	United Kingdom	The cargo ship foundered in the Pacific Ocean between Australia and Mauritius (28°45′N 85°42′E). Her crew took to two lifeboats. Some survivors reached land after 24 days at sea.

== 6 June ==
List of shipwrecks: 6 June 1923
Ship	State	Description
USS Cardinal	United States Navy	The Lapwing-class minesweeper ran aground on the eastern coast of Chirikof Island in the Gulf of Alaska and was wrecked without loss of life. The oiler Cuyama (United States Navy) and the survey ship USC&GS Discoverer ( United States Coast and Geodetic Survey) rescued her crew.

== 8 June ==
List of shipwrecks: 8 June 1923
Ship	State	Description
Lark	United Kingdom	The Thames barge collided with Edmee (United Kingdom) in the River Thames at Millwall, London and sank.

== 10 June ==
List of shipwrecks: 10 June 1923
Ship	State	Description
Maidan	United Kingdom	The cargo liner ran aground on St. John's Island, Egypt and sank.
Nivelle	United Kingdom	The cargo ship came ashore at Lizard Head, Cornwall. Her twenty crew were rescued by the Lizard Lifeboat. She was refloated on 25 June.
Unknown fishing vessel	Japan	The fishing vessel was sunk in a collision with the cruiser Isuzu (Imperial Japanese Navy) during the cruiser's trials, probably off Tokyo. Both crewmen were rescued.

== 13 June ==
List of shipwrecks: 13 June 1923
Ship	State	Description
Agnes	United States	The schooner was sunk in a collision with the trawler Alden Mills (flag unknown) in the main channel of Boston Harbor off the fish pier. One crewman was killed.

== 18 June ==
List of shipwrecks: 18 June 1923
Ship	State	Description
Tensho Maru	Japan	The cargo ship came ashore at Hakodate and was wrecked.

== 19 June ==
List of shipwrecks: 19 June 1923
Ship	State	Description
Ymer	Sweden	The cargo ship ran aground and sank at Sandkamn. Her crew were rescued.

== 21 June ==
List of shipwrecks: 21 June 1923
Ship	State	Description
Tokahachi Maru	Japan	The cargo ship collided with Kelio Maro (Japan) at Hakodate and sank.

== 22 June ==
List of shipwrecks: 22 June 1923
Ship	State	Description
Keisshin Maru No.3	Japan	The cargo ship collided with Kizukawa Maru (Japan) at Kobe and sank.
Maindy Grange	United Kingdom	The cargo ship ran aground at Pointe de Penmarc'h, Finistère, France. She was refloated on 25 June.

== 23 June ==
List of shipwrecks: 23 June 1923
Ship	State	Description
Arantxa Mendi	Spain	The cargo ship ran aground at Cape Trafalgar. She was refloated on 27 June.
Caraquet	United Kingdom	The cargo ship was wrecked at Hamilton, Bermuda.

== 24 June ==
List of shipwrecks: 24 June 1923
Ship	State	Description
Tenshin Maru	Japan	The cargo ship ran aground in the Hirado Strait. She was refloated on 28 June.

== 25 June ==
List of shipwrecks: 25 June 1923
Ship	State	Description
Caraquet	United Kingdom	The cargo liner ran aground on the Northern Reefs, Bermuda. Her passengers were taken off.

== 26 June ==
List of shipwrecks: 26 June 1923
Ship	State	Description
Cornelia	United States	The tug was destroyed by fire at New York.
Sicily	United Kingdom	The cargo ship ran aground in the Paraná River, Argentina. She was refloated on 5 July.
Sumatra	Australia	The cargo ship foundered off Port Maquarie, New South Wales with the loss of all 45 people on board.

== 29 June ==
List of shipwrecks: 29 June 1923
Ship	State	Description
Minnie de Larrinaga	United Kingdom	The cargo ship ran aground st Saint-Louis-du-Rhône, Bouches du Rhône, France. She was refloated on 2 July.

== 30 June ==
List of shipwrecks: 30 June 1923
Ship	State	Description
O. A. Knudsen	Norway	The cargo ship ran aground at Gull Island, Newfoundland and was abandoned by her crew. She had sun by 5 July and was a total loss.
