= Trimmer (surname) =

Trimmer is a surname, and may refer to:

- Arthur Trimmer (1805-1877), early Western Australian settler
- Barry Trimmer, English scientist studying biomechanics
- Ed Trimmer (born 1952), American legislator in the Kansas House of Representatives
- Eric J. Trimmer (1923–1998), English general practitioner and medical writer
- George Trimmer (born 1996), English rugby player
- Sir Jon Trimmer (1939–2023), "Jonty Trimmer", New Zealand ballet dancer
- Joshua Trimmer (1795–1857), English geologist born in Kent
- Joyce Trimmer (1927–2008), Canadian politician, first woman mayor of Scarborough, Ontario
- Lewis Trimmer (born 1989), English footballer
- Sarah Trimmer (1741–1810), English author of The Story of the Robins
- Tony Trimmer (born 1943), English racing car driver
- William Trimmer (1822–1867), winemaker and politician in South Australia
