= Eric J. Trimmer =

English general practitioner and medical writer

Eric James Trimmer
- Eric J. Trimmer in 1988
- Born: 11 June 1923; London, England
- Died: 28 November 1998 (aged 75)
- Occupations: General practitioner, medical writer

Eric James Trimmer (11 June 1923 – 28 November 1998) was an English general practitioner and medical writer.

== Biography ==
Trimmer was born on 11 June 1923 in London. He was educated at King's College London and obtained his M.B.B.S. In 1947 he qualified M.R.C.S. and L.R.C.P. at Westminster Hospital. In the 1950s he worked as a general practitioner in Pinner and as a medical journalist. From 1967 he was a medical advisor for the Reader's Digest. Trimmer was a fellow and council member of the Royal Society of Medicine. He was a member of the British Medical Association, Royal College of General Practitioners and the Royal Society of Health.

Trimmer was the medical editor of Medical News. He was the editor of the British Journal of Sexual Medicine and the British Journal of Clinical Practice for eight years. He was the medical director of the Medical Tribune Group. Trimmer was the medical editor-in-chief for The Visual Dictionary of Sex, published in 1977.

He married Marjorie Rudge in 1947, they had two children. Trimmer used the pseudonyms Eric Jameson and Dr. Philip Lawson.

== The Natural History of Quackery ==
A notable work Trimmer authored was The Natural History of Quackery which documented the history of quackery. He authored the book under the pseudonym Eric Jameson in 1961. He published under the pseudonym because the General Medical Council advised him that publication under his own name would constitute advertisement.

== Selected publications ==
- The Natural History of Quackery (as Eric Jameson, 1961)
- A Young Man's Guide to Medicine (1962)
- Look at the Body (1962)
- Look At Doctors (1963)
- Before Birth, Fact and Fantasy (1965)
- Live Long And Stay Young (1965)
- Medical Folklore and Quackery (1965)
- Femina: A Manual of Sex Hygiene (1966)
- Health on Holiday (1966)
- I Swear and Vow (1966)
- Rejuvenation: The History of an Idea (1967)
- Understanding Anxiety in Everyday Life (1970)
- Having a Baby (1974)
- Basic Sexual Medicine (1978)
- The First Seven Years (1979)
- The Visual Dictionary Of Sex (1977)
- Complete Book of Slimming and Diets (1981)
- Father-To-Be (1983)
- Good Housekeeping Guide to Medicines (1983)
- The-10 Day Relaxation Plan (1984)
- The Magic of Magnesium (1987)
- Selenium: The Trace Element for Health and Life Extension (1988)
- Good Health Food Guide (1994)
