= International Journal of Clinical Practice =

- Discipline: Medicine
- Language: English
- Edited by: Leslie Citrome

Publication details
- Former name(s): Medical Bookman and Historian, Medical Illustrated, British Journal of Clinical Practice
- History: 1947-present
- Publisher: John Wiley & Sons
- Frequency: Monthly
- Impact factor: 2.503 (2020)

Standard abbreviations
- ISO 4: Int. J. Clin. Pract.

Indexing
- CODEN: IJCPF9
- ISSN: 1742-1241
- OCLC no.: 37259930

Links
- Journal homepage; Online access; Online archive

The International Journal of Clinical Practice is a monthly peer-reviewed general medical journal. It was established in 1947 as the Medical Bookman and Historian and changed its name to Medicine Illustrated in 1949. In 1956, its name was again changed, this time to the British Journal of Clinical Practice. The journal obtained its current name in 1997. The journal is published by John Wiley & Sons and the editor-in-chief is Leslie Citrome (New York Medical College). According to the Journal Citation Reports, the journal has a 2020 impact factor of 2.503, ranking it 73rd out of 169 journals in the category "Medicine, General & Internal".
