= May 1923 =

Month in 1923

<<	May 1923					>>
Su	Mo	Tu	We	Th	Fr	Sa
		1	2	3	4	5
6	7	8	9	10	11	12
13	14	15	16	17	18	19
20	21	22	23	24	25	26
27	28	29	30	31

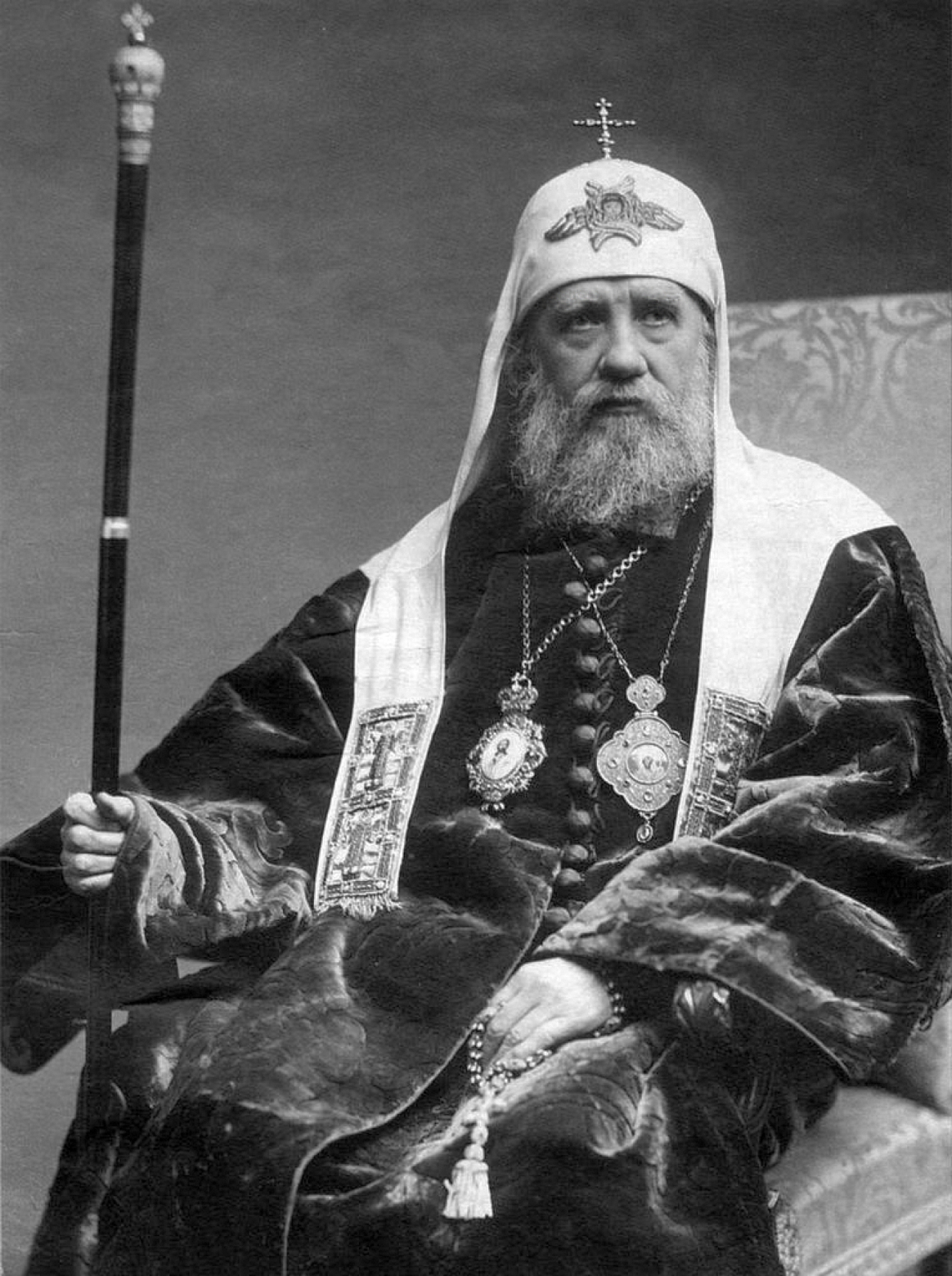
May 3, 1923: Tikhon, Patriarch of Moscow and All Russia, removed by Soviet church leaders, excommunication of Soviet leaders reversed

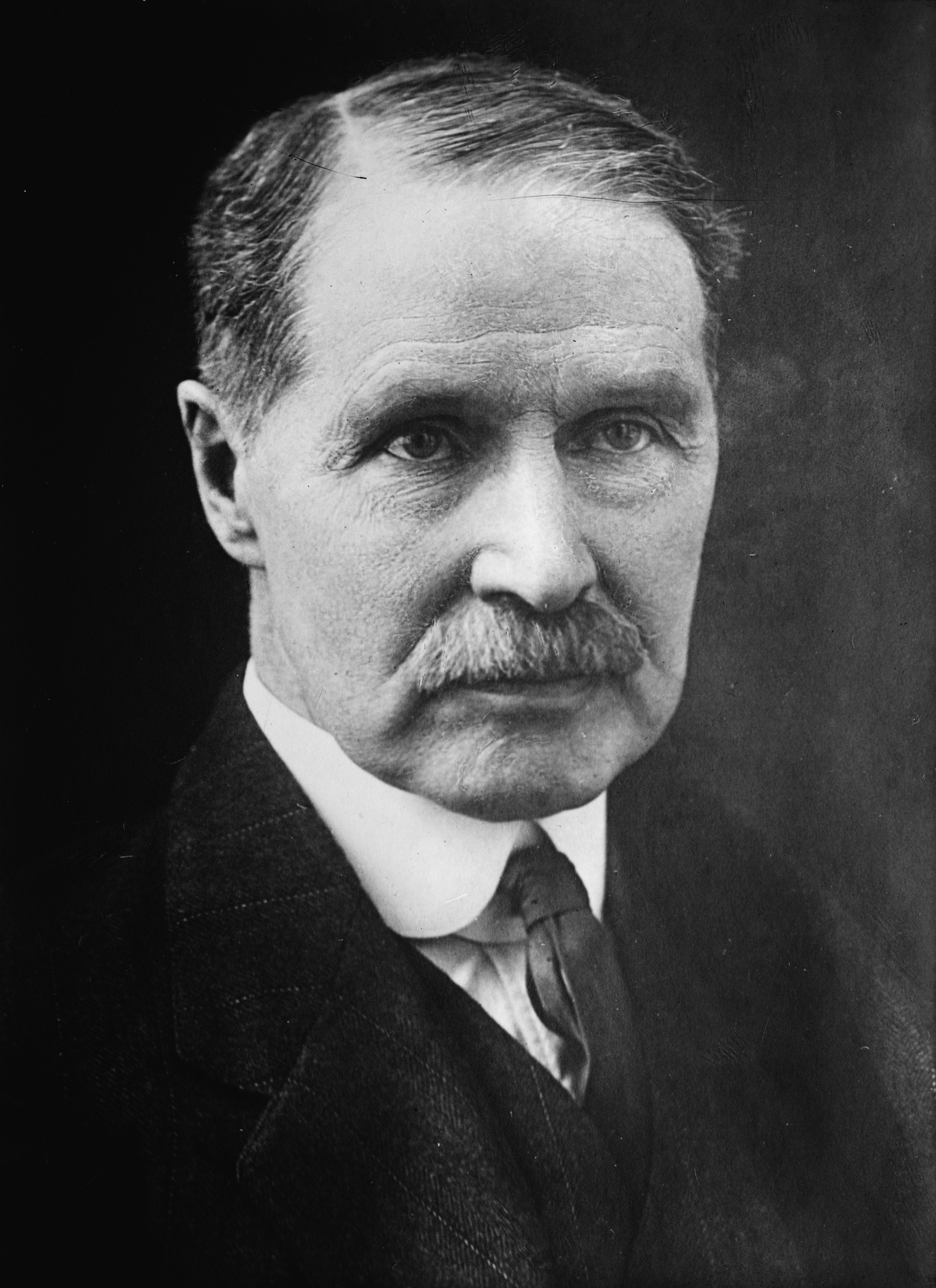
May 20, 1923: British Prime Minister Bonar Law, terminally ill, resigns

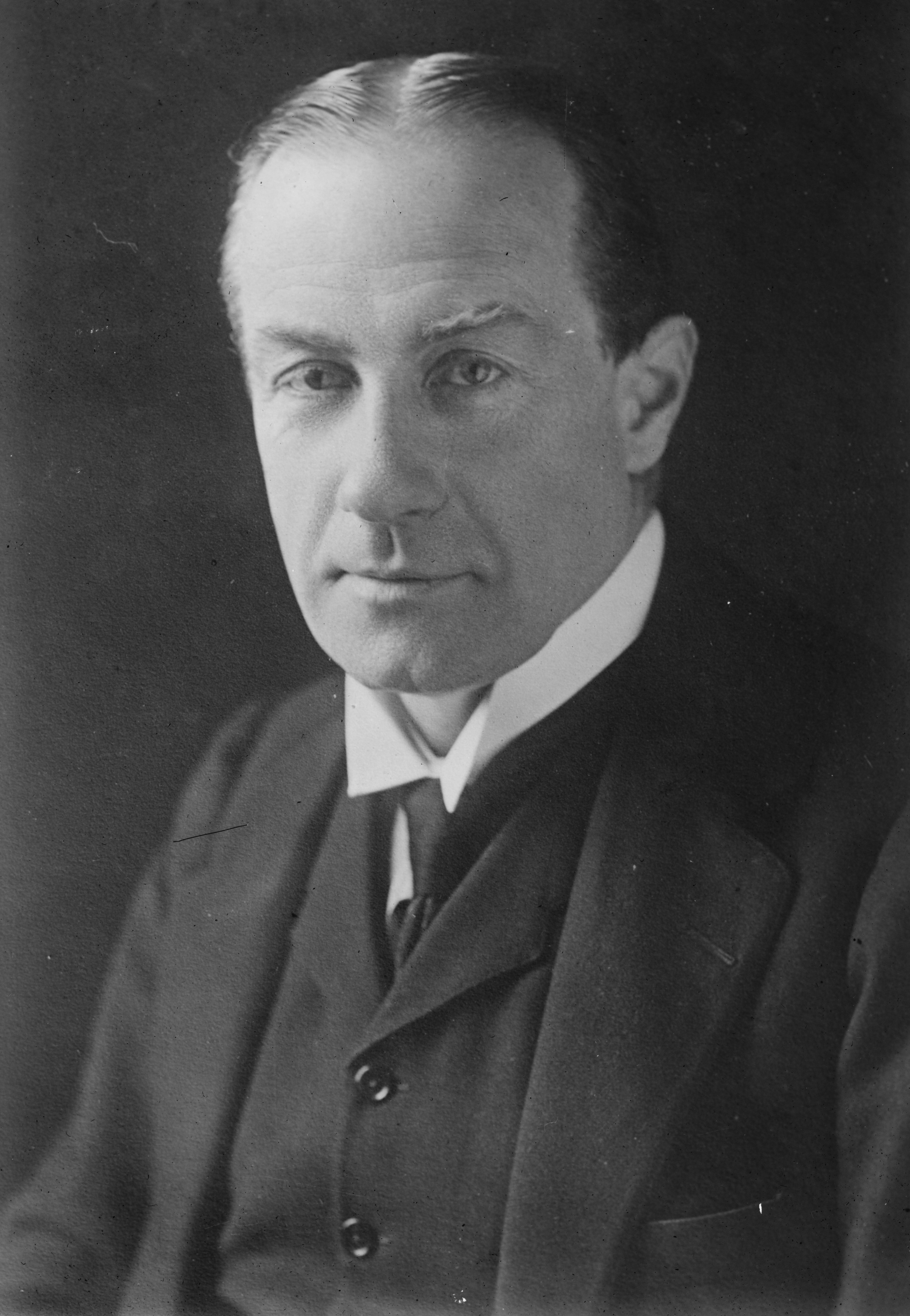
May 22, 1923: Stanley Baldwin takes office as new British prime minister

The following events occurred in May 1923:

== May 1, 1923 (Tuesday) ==
- Construction of the Los Angeles Memorial Coliseum at Exposition Park was completed at a cost of less than $955,000 and less than 17 months after the groundbreaking. Though the structure was built, it would not be used to host events until July 2, when the Monroe Doctrine Centennial Fair was to take place. R. H. Burnside, producer of the Monroe Centennial festivities, inspected the Coliseum on May 3. Tours of the Coliseum began as early as May 10, when Exposition Park hosted the Pasadena Horticultural Society.
- Gustav Krupp von Bohlen und Halbach was arrested by French authorities in Essen on charges from a March 31 shooting incident at the Krupp factory, and put in jail in Werden.
- A meeting of about 500 people at the Pillar of Fire International church in Bound Brook, New Jersey turned into a massive brawl when some attendees resented certain statements made by speakers lauding the Ku Klux Klan. An angry mob trapped about 400 church members on the second floor throwing stones at the building until police restored order in the early hours of the next morning.
- Born:
  - Joseph Heller, American novelist known for the bestselling 1961 novel Catch-22 and the introduction of the word Catch-22 into the English language as a synonym for a no-win situation; in Brooklyn, New York, United States (d. 1999)
  - Fernando Cabrita, Portuguese soccer football forward and manager; in Lagos, Portugal (d. 2014)

== May 2, 1923 (Wednesday) ==
- A jury in St. Joseph, Michigan found Charles E. Ruthenberg guilty of criminal syndicalism by advocating the violent overthrow of the government.
- Everett Scott of the New York Yankees became the first baseball player in history to appear in 1,000 consecutive major league baseball games.
- The British Broadcasting Company opened its new wireless radio studios at Savoy Hill. Heavy wall sacking and floor felt had been installed to reduce noise interference.
- Flooding from a high spring freshet caused extensive damage throughout parts of Maine and New Brunswick.
- Born: Patrick Hillery, President of Ireland from 1976 to 1990; in Spanish Point, County Clare (d. 2008)
- Died: Emilio Picariello, 47, and Florence Lassandro, 22, Italian-born Canadian bootleggers, were hanged at 5:00 and 5:15 in the morning at the provincial prison in Fort Saskatchewan, Alberta, after being convicted of the September 21 murder of an Alberta Provincial Police constable.

== May 3, 1923 (Thursday) ==
- American army pilots Oakley G. Kelly and John A. Macready completed the first non-stop transcontinental flight across the U.S. when they landed their T-2 airplane at Rockwell Field near San Diego after taking off from Roosevelt Field at Hempstead, New York at 1:37 in the afternoon, Eastern Time (1737 UTC) 26 hours, 50 minutes and 38.6 seconds earlier. The T-2 landed at Rockwell at 12:26:56 p.m. Pacific time (3:26 EDT, 1926 UTC).
- The Pan-American Treaty, officially the "Treaty to Avoid or Prevent Conflicts between the American States", was signed in Santiago, capital of Chile, by representatives of 16 nations in the Western Hemisphere (Argentina, Brazil, Chile, Colombia, Cuba, the Dominican Republic, Ecuador, Guatemala, Haiti, Honduras, Nicaragua, Panama, Paraguay, the United States, Uruguay and Venezuela).
- Archbishop Tikhon, Patriarch of Moscow and All Russia and leader of the Russian Orthodox Church since 1917, was expelled from the church and branded a traitor by the Communist-dominated All-Russian Church Council. A bulletin from the Council stated, "Inasmuch as the Soviet Government is the only one in the whole world fighting capitalism, which is one of the seven deadly sins, therefore its struggle is a sacred struggle. The Council condemns the counterrevolutionary acts of Tikhon and his adherents, lifts the ban of excommunication he laid on the Soviet Government, and brands him as a traitor to the Church and to Russia. It hereby formally abolishes the office of Patriarch forever and establishes an annual Church Council as the supreme directive body in Church affairs."
- Born: Ralph Hall, U.S. Representative for Texas, 1981 to 2015 and Chair of the House Science Committee; in Fate, Texas (d. 2019)
- Died: Ernst Hartwig, 72, German astronomer who discovered the first supernova identified on Earth as being from another galaxy (SN 1885A in the Andromeda Galaxy)

== May 4, 1923 (Friday) ==
- The legislature of the U.S. state of New York voted to repeal its Prohibition law, leaving enforcement to federal authorities. New York governor Alfred E. Smith was expected to sign the bill into law. The New York law had been more strict than the federal law and had given civic police broad powers of enforcement.
- The House of Commons of Canada passed the Chinese Immigration Act, commonly known as the Chinese Exclusion Act, forbidding Chinese to enter Canada unless they were diplomats, children born in Canada, merchants, or university students.
- Born:
  - Elwyn Jones, Welsh TV producer known for co-creating the BBC series Z-Cars, as well as its spinoffs Softly, Softly and Barlow at Large; in Cwmaman, Glamorgan (d. 1982)
  - Guy Warren (stage name for Warren Gamaliel Kpakpo Akwei), Ghana-born American musician credited with the invention of the "Afro-jazz" genre; in Accra (d. 2008)
  - Eric Sykes, English writer, comedian and director; in Oldham, Lancashire (d. 2012)
  - Benjamin Britt, African-American painter; in Winfall, North Carolina (d. 1996)
  - Assi Rahbani, Lebanese musician and political activist; in Antelias, Lebanon (d. 1986)
- Died: John W. Rainey, 42, U.S. representative for Illinois since 1918, died of pneumonia.

== May 5, 1923 (Saturday) ==
- Broadcasting in Singapore began when Radio Singapura was established.
- Hull Kingston Rovers defeated Huddersfield, 15 to 5, to win the Northern Rugby Football League championship in England.
- Born:
  - Tim Moriarty, American sportswriter inducted into the Hockey Hall of Fame as a journalist; in Southbridge, Massachusetts (d. 2006)
  - Richard Wollheim, British philosopher and President of the British Society of Aesthetics from 1992 until his death; in London (d. 2003)

== May 6, 1923 (Sunday) ==
- In China, more than 300 passengers on the Tianjin–Pukou Railway line's Blue Express luxury train were taken hostage by bandits when the train passed through Lincheng in the Shandong Province while traveling from Shanghai to Beijing.
- The first World Congress of Jewish Women, organized by Anitta Müller-Cohen, opened at the Hofburg Palace in Vienna for a six-day session with 200 delegates from 20 nations.
- The head-on collision of two trains at the village of Arcos de Canasí in Cuba killed 25 people in a fiery crash and injured 50 others. The trains, both operated by the Hershey Railway line, collided after a westbound train from Matanzas to Havana failed to pull to a siding to allow the eastbound train from Havana to come through.
- The United Kingdom's first fascist party, the right-wing British Fascisti, was founded by a former member of the Women's Volunteer Reserve, Rotha Lintorn-Orman.
- Red Star Olympique defeated FC Sète 4-2 in the Coupe de France Final, the championship tournament of French soccer football.
- The championship of Mexico's national soccer football league, the Primera Fuerza, was won on the last day of the regular season when unbeaten (11-0-2) Germania F.V. was scheduled against second place Asturias F.C. (10-2-1). Germania led, 1-0, at halftime but Asturias tied the game and Octavio Rimada scored for the 2 to 1 win.
- The sport of bullfighting came to Italy for the first time as Spanish organizers put on an event for 30,000 spectators at the national stadium in Rome to watch as "Six imported Spanish matadors successively encounter as many bulls."
- Born:
  - Harry Watson, Canadian ice hockey left wing with 14 seasons in the NHL, inductee in the Hockey Hall of Fame; in Saskatoon, Saskatchewan (d. 2002)
  - Sid Yudain, American journalist who founded the political journal Roll Call in 1955; in New Canaan, Connecticut (d. 2013)
  - Princess Galyani Vadhana of Thailand, English-born older sister of two future Kings of Thailand, Ananda Mahidol (Rama VIII) and King Bhumibol Adulyadej (Rama IX); in London (d. 2008)

== May 7, 1923 (Monday) ==
- A message from Queen Wilhelmina of the Netherlands was the first broadcast from The Hague of what was, at the time, the world's most powerful radio station, designed to be received in the Dutch East Indies 7,500 miles (12,100 km) away.
- The Kingdom of Bulgaria revealed to its subjects that it had signed the Treaty of Niš with Yugoslavia on March 23.
- Two Americans and an Englishman were shot when Chinese train bandits put hostages in the front lines as troops attacked. Lucy Aldrich, daughter of U.S. senator Nelson W. Aldrich and sister-in-law of John D. Rockefeller Jr., was released by the bandits.
- Estonian parliamentary elections produced a very fragmented parliament with the Farmers' Assemblies winning the most seats.
- Born:
  - Anne Baxter, American stage, film and television actress, winner of the Academy Award for Best Supporting Actor for The Razor's Edge; in Michigan City, Indiana (d. of a stroke, 1985)
  - J. Mack Robinson, U.S. businessman and philanthropist; in Atlanta (d. 2014)
- Died: Sadie Martinot, 61, American opera soprano and stage actress

== May 8, 1923 (Tuesday) ==
- A French court martial sentenced Gustav Krupp von Bohlen und Halbach to fifteen years hard labour.

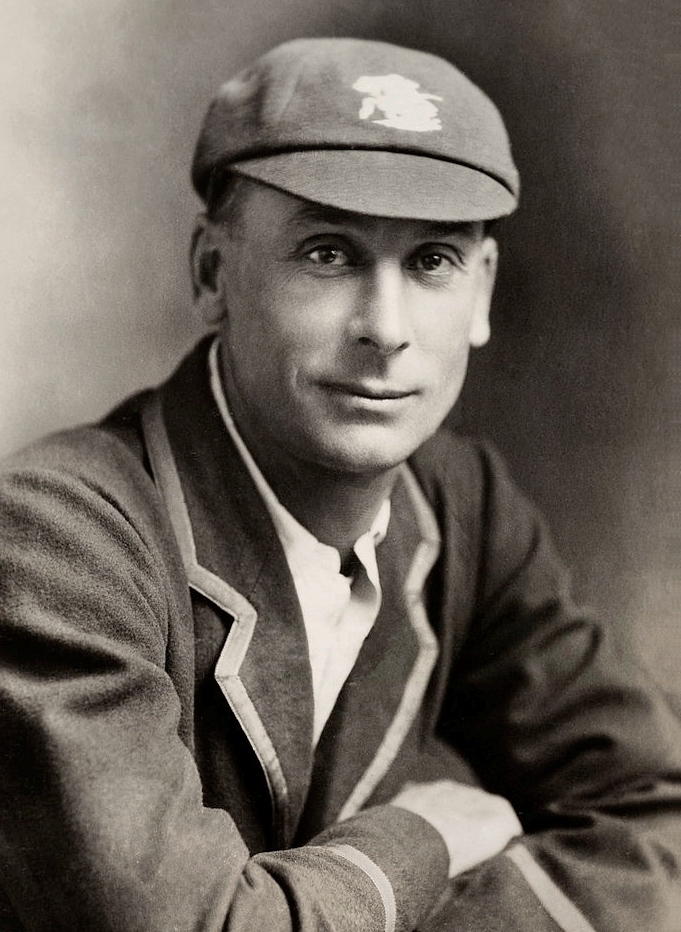
Hobbs

- Jack Hobbs, playing for Surrey against Somerset, completed his hundredth century (i.e., 100 runs in a game) in first-class cricket. He was only the third player (after W. G. Grace and Tom Hayward) to accomplish the "century of centuries". Hobbs scored 116 runs in a 216 to 168 win at Bath.
- In the U.S. state of Florida, Collier County, Florida was formed from the southern portion of Lee County, which was split into three counties. Everglades City was the initial seat of government for the county, which was named for land developer Barron Collier.
- Liseberg, an amusement park in Gothenburg, Sweden, opened.
- Born: Jack Laird (pen name for Jack Laird Schultheis), American screenwriter and director; in Monrovia, California (d. 1991)

== May 9, 1923 (Wednesday) ==
- The ignition of an oil well gusher by a spark killed 15 employees of the J. K. Hughes Development Company who were working at the McKie No. 1 oil well in Navarro County, Texas near the town of Kerens.
- Testimony revealing the brutal treatment of convict labor at the Knabb Turpentine Company camps in North Florida was given to a state investigative committee by social worker Thelma Franklin of the town of Glen St. Mary. Mrs. Franklin described witnessing the murder of two African American women by a man called Warden Thompson. One of the victims, a black laborer named Mary Sheffield, had been scheduled to appear before the committee as a witness.
- The Chinese government agreed to pay the ransom demanded by the train bandits.
- Irish President W. T. Cosgrave said that negotiations between the government and the Irish Republican Army had broken down because the Republicans had refused to surrender their arms.
- The Bertolt Brecht play In the Jungle of Cities premiered at the Residenz Theatre in Munich.
- Born: André Parat, French custom automobile maker in partnership with Bernard Pichon in the Pichon-Parat company (d. 1983)
- Died:
  - John Fuller, 72, popular New Zealand singer and theater manager
  - Lieutenant General Constantin Cristescu, 57, Chief of Staff of the Romanian Army

== May 10, 1923 (Thursday) ==
- Vatslav Vorovsky, the Soviet delegate to the Conference of Lausanne, was assassinated in the restaurant of the Cecil Hotel. Two of his associates were both wounded when they resisted. The assassin, a Swiss officer named Maurice Conradi, handed the gun to a waiter, asked him to call the police and waited until authorities arrived to arrest him. Vorovsky was 51 years old. The May 20 funeral for Ambassador Vorovsky, hailed as a hero by the Soviet Union, came with an estimated 250,000 residents of Moscow lining the streets to watch the funeral procession.
- Sovnarkom, the Soviet Union's Council of People's Commissars, decreed a reform of the taxation of the nation's farms, abolishing the paying of taxes by collection of food produce (Prodnalog) effective 1924, and replacing it with a universal direct agricultural tax payable in cash.
- Born:
  - Heydar Aliyev, President of Azerbaijan from 1993 until his death; in Nakhichevan, Transcaucasian SFSR (d. 2003)
  - Henry Fok (Fok Ying Tung), Hong Kong billionaire tycoon who became Vice Chairperson of the Chinese People's Political Consultative Conference after Hong Kong's 1997 annexation into the People's Republic of China; in British Hong Kong (d. 2006)
  - Michael Hurley, Irish Jesuit Catholic priest and theologian who promoted ecumenism in an attempt at Christian unity and dialogue between the Catholic and Protestant faiths; in Ardmore, County Waterford (d. 2011)
  - Gloria Tew, internationally-known American sculptor; in Duluth, Minnesota (d. 2022)
- Died: Flora Cooke Stuart, American educator and widow of Confederate Army General J. E. B. Stuart, died of a skull fracture after falling while walking in Norfolk, Virginia. Her death came two days short of the 59th anniversary of her husband's 1864 death in the American Civil War.

== May 11, 1923 (Friday) ==
- The St. Louis Cardinals and Philadelphia Phillies set a new major league baseball record for total home runs in a game when they combined to hit ten during a 20–14 Phillies victory at Baker Bowl. The record stood until 1966.
- Hendry County, Florida was formed from the eastern portion of Lee County, which was split into three counties. LaBelle was the initial seat of government for the county, which was named for the daughters of pioneer cattle rancher Francis A. Hendry.
- Born: Louise Arnold, American baseball pitcher for the AAGPBL's South Bend Blue Sox, 1951 highest winning percentage leader; in Pawtucket, Rhode Island (d. 2010)
- Died:
  - Edwin Deakin, 84, British-born American landscape artist
  - Samuel P. Mackay, 58, Australian businessman and landowner

== May 12, 1923 (Saturday) ==
- Nearly 63,000 people packed Yankee Stadium in New York to watch the first boxing card in the venue's history, five bouts organized by Tex Rickard to raise money for the Milk Fund Charity, which received $260,000 after expenses were paid from a gate of $390,000. The New York Times wrote the next day, "Probably no greater collection of prominent pugilists ever was assembled in one ring," In the final bout, former heavyweight champion Jess Willard knocked out Floyd Johnson in the eleventh round.
- Born: Gilbert Horn Sr., Native American Sioux Indian and U.S. Army special ops agent, "code talker" during World War II transmitting and receiving messages in the Assiniboine language; at the Fort Belknap Indian Reservation in Montana (d. 2016)
- Died:
  - U.S. Marines Lieutenant Colonel Earl "Pete" Ellis, 42, American military strategist and administrator; from cirrhosis of the liver.
  - Alonzo T. Jones, 72, Seventh Day Adventist theologian and writer

== May 13, 1923 (Sunday) ==
- Athletic Bilbao defeated Barcelona's CD Europa, 1-0, in the Copa del Rey Final.
- Mother's Day was given nationwide recognition for the first time in Germany.
- Born: Nikolai Pastukhov, Soviet Russian film actor, star of The Stationmaster and From Dawn Till Sunset; in Surazh, Russian SFSR, Soviet Union (d. 2014)
- Died: Charlotte Garrigue, 72, First Lady of Czechoslovakia and wife of President Tomáš Masaryk

== May 14, 1923 (Monday) ==
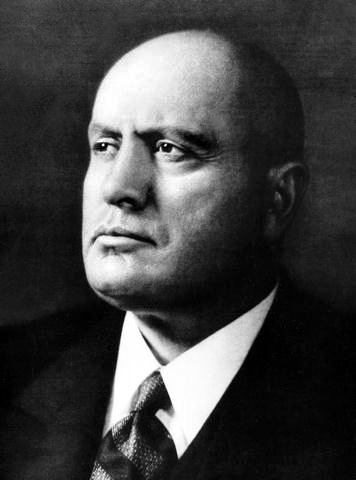
Mussolini

- In the deadliest airplane crash of the year, all six people aboard an Air Union flight, from Le Bourget Airport in Paris to London's Croydon airport, were killed when a wing sheared off the Farman F.60 Goliath airliner. The airplane crashed near the village of Monsures as it was approaching the English Channel.
- Benito Mussolini made a speech at the international women's suffrage congress in Rome in which he expressed support for the suffragists' cause. "Regarding the attitude of the government, I feel authorized in stating that the fascist government pledges itself to grant a vote to several classes of women, beginning with a local vote and then a national vote", Mussolini said.
- Born: Josette Molland, artist and member of the French Resistance in World War II (d. 2024)
- Died: Charles de Freycinet, 94, four-time Prime Minister of France

== May 15, 1923 (Tuesday) ==
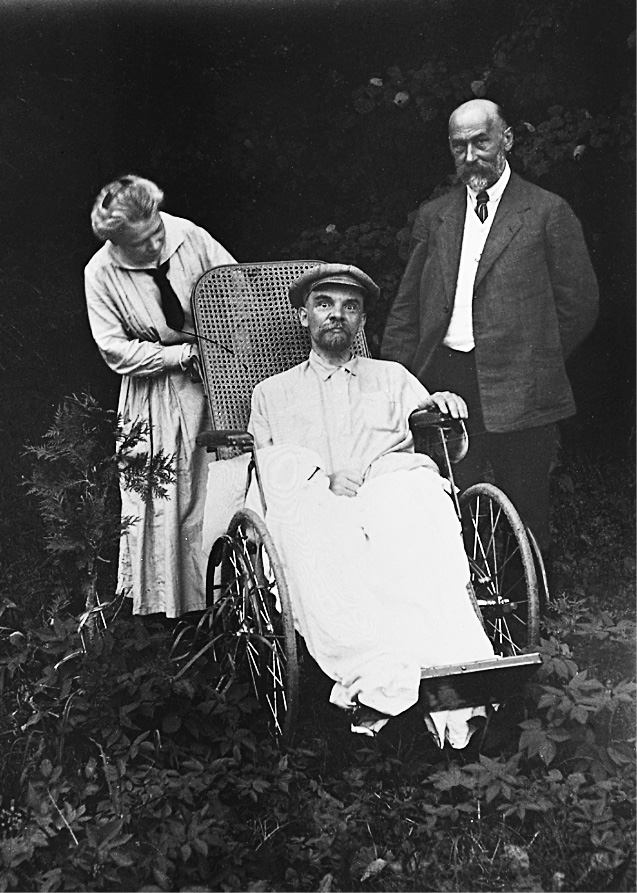
Vladimir Lenin in his Wheelchair

- In failing health, Soviet Communist Party boss Vladimir Lenin moved from his office in the Kremlin in Moscow to his vacation dacha in the Gorki Leninskiye neighborhood and would live there eight more months before his death on January 21.
- At noon, 81 separate radio frequencies went into operation as broadcasting stations across the United States shifted to new positions on the radio dial by adjusting their transmitters to the allotted airwave limits between 220 and 545 meters wavelength. The new frequencies ranged from 550 kHz (545m wavelength) to 1350 kHz (220m) in bands 10 kHz apart. Previously, only three frequencies (620 kHz for news and 830 kHz for entertainment, later supplemented by 750 kHz) had been reserved for broadcast use. The decision had been made after the Second National Radio Conference on March 20, 1923.
- The League of Nations approved the transfer of all of Galicia to Poland in accordance with the March 14 decision of the Conference of Ambassadors.
- British MP John Turner Walton Newbold, of the Communist Party of Great Britain, was suspended from the House of Commons after he protested to Speaker of the House Edward FitzRoy, "You allowed charges to be made against me all the evening without giving me a chance to reply." Fitzroy said that was "not a Parliamentary expression" and asked Newbold to leave. After a commotion a vote was taken and Newbold was suspended by a count of 300 to 88.
- Professional football coach Charles Brickley, who had organized the first New York Giants football team (Brickley's Giants in 1921), was indicted by an Illinois court on charges of illegal stock negotiations.
- Amelia Earhart was the 16th woman to be given a pilot's license by the Fédération Aéronautique Internationale.
- Born:
  - Doris Dowling, American actress; in Detroit (d. 2004)
  - John Lanchbery, English composer and conductor; in London (d. 2003)

== May 16, 1923 (Wednesday) ==
- The Chinese bandits tossed three hostages to their deaths over a precipice as a warning to speed up the ransom payment.
- Born:
  - Merton Miller, economist and Nobel Prize laureate; in Boston (d. 2000)
  - Cyril Roy Hart, British historian who documented in detail the Anglo-Saxon kingdoms; in East Ham, London (alive in 2026)
- Died: George Jay Gould, 59, American railroad executive and financier, died of a fever while vacationing in France, a few months after visiting the Tomb of Tutankhamun in Egypt, adding to the "Curse of the Pharaohs" legend which began after the April 5 death of Lord Carnarvon.

== May 17, 1923 (Thursday) ==
- A fire killed 77 people, 41 of them children, at the Cleveland School near Camden, South Carolina. The casualties had been part of 300 people in the auditorium, attending the last graduation ceremony for the school and a short play, Miss Topsy Turvy.
- Romania's Unknown Soldier was buried with full military honors in Carol Park in Bucharest.
- The town of Hyde Park, California, was incorporated into Los Angeles after approval in a local referendum.
- Died:
  - Manuel Allendesalazar, 66, Prime Minister of Spain 1919-1920
  - Thomas Scott Baldwin, 68, American acrobat and balloonist who (on January 30, 1887) made the first recorded parachute jump from a balloon, and later became an airplane and dirigible designer, died of natural causes.

== May 18, 1923 (Friday) ==
- A performance of Bertolt Brecht's play In the Jungle of Cities at the Residenz Theatre in Munich was disrupted by Nazis who threw gas bombs into the auditorium. The play was resumed but the production was soon withdrawn.
- Czech Radio, originally Czechoslovakia Radio (Československý rozhlas) began broadcasting.
- Born: Hugh Shearer, Prime Minister of Jamaica from 1967 to 1972; in Martha's Brae, Trelawny Parish (d. 2004)

== May 19, 1923 (Saturday) ==
- The principal leaders of the Committee for the Independence of Georgia underground movement, Damkom, were put to death by the Soviet Union's Cheka security agency outside of Tbilisi after being convicted of treason. The persons executed, all by gunshot, included Aleksandre Andronikashvili, Varden Tsulukidze, and Prince Giorgi Tsulukidze.
- Zev, a thoroughbred race horse owned by Sinclair Oil founder Harry F. Sinclair and ridden by Earl Sande, won the Kentucky Derby.
- About 1,000 advocates of women's suffrage marched through the streets of Rome. Benito Mussolini reviewed the parade and reiterated his pledge to give the vote to certain classes of Italian women by the end of the year.
- Died: Prince Abhakara Kiartivongse, 42, founder of the Royal Thai Navy, son of King Chulalongkorn and half brother of King Vajiravudh, died of influenza.

== May 20, 1923 (Sunday) ==
- British prime minister Bonar Law resigned after less than seven months in office, because of serious illness from throat cancer. An announcement from the prime minister's residence at 10 Downing Street in London was made by his three medical advisers, Dr. Thomas Horder, Dr. Gould May and Dr. Douglas Harmer, who wrote "In spite of his rest the Prime Minister's voice is still unsatisfactory. We are unable to promise improvement within a reasonable time. The state of the Prime Minister's health is not good." A statement from King George V, the monarch said "The King has received the Right Honorable A. Bonar Law's communication with deepest regret and has graciously accepted his resignation. Law would die from throat cancer five months later, on October 30.
- Mestalla Stadium opened in Valencia in Spain.
- Born:
  - Edith Fellows, American child actress; in Boston (d. 2011)
  - Steve Krantz, American film producer and writer; in Brooklyn, New York City (d. 2007)
  - Sam Selvon, Trinidanian writer; in Trinidad (d. 1994)
  - Betty Willis, American graphic artist; in Overton, Nevada (d. 2015)
- Died: Prince Kote Abkhazi, 55, former Russian Imperial Army General and later Chairman of the Georgian National-Democratic Party, was executed by the Soviet Cheka security police after being convicted of treason for being in the underground independence movement Damkom, along with former Colonel Giorgi Khimshiashvili.

== May 21, 1923 (Monday) ==
- The world's largest organization of socialist and labor parties, Labour and Socialist International (LSI), was created by the merger of the 34-year old Second International and the newer International Working Union of Socialist Parties (IWUSP).
- Delmonico's, New York City's most famous luxury restaurant, was closed by the Delmonico family after 96 years of operation. Opened by brothers Giovanni and Pietro Delmonico on December 13, 1827 at 23 William Street as a small cafe, the main restaurant had only one outlet remaining and was a casualty of the Prohibition Era. At 9:00 in the evening, the restaurant's orchestra played Auld Lang Syne and closed its doors. Despite the departure of the Delmonico family, the rights to operate a new location under the Delmonico's name would be purchased three years later by Oscar Tucci.
- All 436 persons on the Canadian Pacific ocean liner Marvale were rescued after the ship struck Cape Freels Rock in Newfoundland's Trepassey Bay and began to sink. The 214 passengers and 222 crew members were quickly evacuated and reached the shore safely to be housed at the village of St. Shotts, Newfoundland. The Marvale sank later in the day.
- The Frederick Lonsdale comedic play Aren't We All? premiered on Broadway.
- The Turkey national football team became the twenty-sixth member of FIFA.
- The football club Octavio Espinoza was founded in Ica, Peru.
- Born:
  - Ara Parseghian, American football coach for Notre Dame; in Akron, Ohio (d. 2017)
  - Armand Borel, Swiss mathematician; in La Chaux-de-Fonds (d. 2003)
  - Dorothy Hewett, Australian writer; in Perth (d. 2002)
  - Evelyn Ward, U.S. actress; in West Orange, New Jersey (d. 2012)
- Died:
  - Hans Goldschmidt, 62, German chemist
  - General Cho Tong-yun, 51, officer of the Imperial Korean Army and collaborator in the Japanese annexation of Korea in 1910.

== May 22, 1923 (Tuesday) ==
- Stanley Baldwin, the chancellor of the exchequer, took office as the new prime minister of the United Kingdom, although Lord Curzon had been expected to succeed Bonar Law A theory was that Curzon, a member of the House of Lords, had been passed over at a time when the labour movement's growing power called for an elected Member of Parliament, rather than a Peer, to lead the government.
- The value of Germany's currency, the mark continued its decline and dropped below 1/50000th of a U.S. dollar for the first time. As the worth of a mark progressed from 50,000 per US$ to 57,000 per US$ during the day, the government announced that the price of bread would double, that the price of a ride on a street car would increase by one-third from 300 marks to 400 on June 1, and that passenger trips on trains would double on June 4.
- Born: Max Velthuijs, Dutch writer, artist and children's book illustrator; in Den Haag (d. 2005)

== May 23, 1923 (Wednesday) ==
- The Belgian airline SABENA (Societé anonyme belge d'Exploitation de la Navigation aérienne or 'Belgian Limited Company for the Exploitation of Aerial Navigation') was founded.
- Compagnie générale transsaharienne (CGT), created to provide transportation and lodging across the French colonies in North Africa, was founded by Gaston Gradis. It would operate until 1950.
- Supertest Petroleum, which would operate gasoline stations in Canada from coast to coast, opened its first-ever filling station. John Gordon Thompson acquired a station at 362 Dundas Street East in London, Ontario to begin a chain of stations. It would operate until being acquired by BP Canada in 1973.
- The demilitarized "neutral strip", created in 1920 between Lithuania and Poland and six kilometers in width, was taken over by Lithuania after having been used as a staging zone by militias.
- Born:
  - Palden Thondup Namgyal, the last ruler of the Kingdom of Sikkim, from 1963 to 1975, prior to its becoming a state of India; in Gangtok, Sikkim (d. 1982)
  - Kalidas Shrestha, Nepalese artist; in Kathmandu (d. 2016)

== May 24, 1923 (Thursday) ==
- The Irish Civil War came to an end. Éamon de Valera, leader of the Irish Republican movement, and Frank Aiken, the Irish Republican Army chief of staff, issued an order to all IRA volunteers to lay down weapons and return home. The order permitted an honorable end to the violence without a formal surrender, and was unconditional, in that there was no offer at the time of a general amnesty by the Irish Free State government. De Valera's order to the ranks stated, "Soldiers of liberty! Legion of the rear guard! The republic can no longer be sustained successfully by your arms. Further sacrifices on your part would now be in vain. The continuance of the struggle in arms is unwise in the national interest," and added, "You have saved the nation's honor and left the road open to independence. Laying aside your arms now is an act of patriotism as exalted and pure as your valor in taking them up." Aiken stated separately, "Our enemies have demanded our arms. Our answer is we took up arms to free our country; we keep them until we see an honorable way of recovering our objective without arms."
- The San Pedro Maritime Strike ended after one month.
- France's prime minister Raymond Poincaré and his cabinet of ministers dramatically gave their resignations after an adverse vote in the French Senate. President Alexandre Millerand was hosting a dinner at the Élysée Palace to celebrate the centennial of the birth of Louis Pasteur when the group interrupted to ask the president to meet them in his office. The Senate had voted not to put Deputy Marcel Cachin, a Communist Party member of parliament, on trial, prompting the resignation. After 45 minutes, Millerand persuaded Poincaré to remain in office.

== May 25, 1923 (Friday) ==
- A 5.7 magnitude earthquake in Iran killed 2,200 people in and around the city of Torbat-e Heydarieh.
- Communists ransacked the German city of Essen as strikes spread throughout the Ruhr region.
- Born:
  - Josef Zemann, Austrian mineralogist for whom the mineral Zemannite (Mg_{0.5}ZnFe^{3+}[TeO_{3}]_{3}·4.5H_{2}O) is named; in Vienna (d. 2022)
  - Admiral R. L. Pereira, Indian Navy officer and Chairman of the Chiefs of Staff 1981-1982; in Calcutta, Bengal Province, British India (d. 1993)

== May 26, 1923 (Saturday) ==
- British authorities in Palestine, under League of Nations mandate, issued a declaration of autonomy to the Emirate of Transjordan, now the Kingdom of Jordan.
- Hundreds of thousands of workers in the Ruhr joined a "hunger strike" while seven more died in rioting.
- Hamad ibn Isa Al Khalifa was proclaimed the heir to the throne of the Kingdom of Bahrain, and the Arab sheikdom's deputy ruler, by his father, the Hakim Isa ibn Ali Al Khalifa.
- At the Lausanne Conference in Switzerland, Greek Foreign Minister Eleftherios Venizelos and Turkish representative İsmet İnönü shook hands on an agreement to resolve the issue of Greece's payment of reparations to Turkey for the recent war. Turkey waived further claims in return for transfer of Greek territory in Thrace to Turkish control.
- General Wladyslaw Sikorski, Prime Minister of Poland since December, resigned along with his government after five months in office.

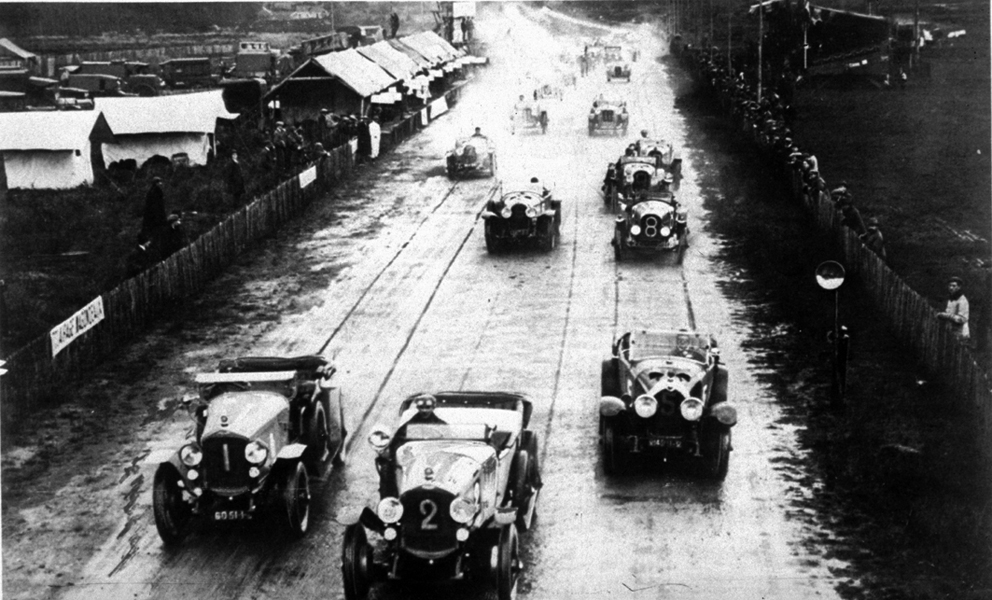
The start of the first 24 Hours of Le Mans race

- The first 24 Hours of Le Mans race began at 4:00 in the afternoon in France with a field of 33 two-man teams from 17 different French auto manufacturers, two from Belgium and one representing Britain's Bentley company.
- The earth inductor compass, invented by Donald M. Bliss in 1912, was tested successfully for the first time, in a flight from McCook Air Field.
- William Randolph Hearst said he would back Henry Ford if he ran for President of the United States, but said Ford would have to run as an independent candidate because "the political machinery of both the national parties is in the hands of the old line reactionaries."
- Born:
  - James Arness, American television actor best known as the star of Gunsmoke; in Minneapolis, Minnesota (d. 2011)
  - Roy Dotrice, British stage actor best known as the star of the play Brief Lives; in Guernsey, Channel Islands (d. 2017)
  - Horst Tappert, German television actor best known as the star of the long-running TV police drama Derrick; in Elberfeld (d. 2008)
  - Harry G. Johnson, pioneering Canadian economist; in Toronto (died of a stroke, 1977)
- Died: Albert Leo Schlageter, 28, the first German Nazi martyr, was executed by a French Army firing squad for sabotaging a railroad track in Germany's French-occupied Ruhr region.

== May 27, 1923 (Sunday) ==
- André Lagache and René Léonard of France, the drivers for the Chenard-Walcker Automobile Company team, won the first Le Mans Grand Prix of Endurance auto race, completing 128 laps on the 10.72 miles (17.25 km) circuit that ran from Le Mans to Mulsanne.
- The League of Nations gave notice to the Greek-speaking residents of the Orestiada triangle in Western Thrace that Orestiada, and the nearby towns of Bosna and Demerdes, were to be transferred to Turkish control. The former Orestiada was renamed Kumçiftliği, and the Greek residents began moving to a new location beginning July 1. The transfer was completed by September 15 to a new Orestiada, being built 10 miles (16 km) to the south.
- Born: Henry Kissinger, German-born American diplomat, U.S. National Security Advisor 1969 to 1975, and later the U.S. Secretary of State, 1973 to 1977; as Heinz Alfred Kißinger, in Fürth (d. 2023)
- Died:
  - Alexander McDougall, 78, Scottish-born American ship designer who created the whaleback cargo ship
  - William Garnet South, 67, Australian police officer and "Chief Protector of Aborigines" since 1911.
  - Miša Aleksić-Marinko, 47, Serbian army officer and war hero

== May 28, 1923 (Monday) ==
- The Santa Rita oil well in Reagan County, Texas produced its first gusher on land owned by the struggling University of Texas, providing the university with a major source of income that would make it among the wealthiest in the United States.
- The success of the newly developed drug tryparsamide, as a treatment and cure for African trypanosomiasis, commonly called "sleeping sickness", was announced by Dr. Simon Flexner of the Rockefeller Institute for Medical Research, in an article in the Journal of the American Medical Association. The drug had been developed by Walter A. Jacobs and Michael Heidelberger from arsenic compounds.
- Twelfth Night, written in 1601 by William Shakespeare, became the first of the Bard's plays to be performed on the radio. An adaptation, trimmed to less than two hours by Cathleen Nesbitt, was broadcast at 7:30 in the evening on BBC Radio with Gerald Lawrence portraying Orsino, and Nesbitt voicing both Viola and Sebastian.
- Born: '
  - N. T. Rama Rao, Indian film star who later entered politics and was elected the Chief Minister of the state of Andhra Pradesh three times between 1983 and 1995; in Nimmakuru, Madras Province, British India (d. 1996)
  - György Ligeti, Romanian-born Hungarian-Austrian composer; in Tarnava-Sanmartin (d. 2006)
  - Boris Schreiber, German-born French novelist; in Berlin (d. 2008)
- Died: Joseph Byron, 76, English-born American professional photographer; in Nottingham, Nottinghamshire

== May 29, 1923 (Tuesday) ==
- Strikes in the Ruhr spread to parts of Germany outside of the French occupation zone.
- Died:
  - Albert Deullin, 32, French World War I flying ace, was killed in a crash while testing a new airplane prototype
  - Adolf Oberländer, 78, German caricaturist

== May 30, 1923 (Wednesday) ==
- Jesse W. Smith, 52, a close friend of and assistant to U.S. Attorney General Harry M. Daugherty, was found dead of a gunshot wound to the head, in Daugherty's private apartment at the Wardman Park Hotel in Washington, D.C. Smith's suicide was attributed to depression over illness from diabetes, and continuing pain from surgery the previous year, but also came six weeks after The Wall Street Journal had broken the news of the Teapot Dome scandal.
- Germany's 500,000 striking miners in the Ruhr agreed to return to work after the government offered a 50% wage increase.
- Tommy Milton won the Indianapolis 500 for the second time, in front of what the Associated Press described as "the greatest throng that ever witnessed a sporting event in America," with 150,000 spectators. The second place finisher, Harry Hartz, finished five miles behind Milton. The race was marred by tragedy when a 16-year-old spectator, Bert Shoup, was killed when Tom Alley's car crashed into a fence where Shoup and two friends were standing.
- Jack Bernstein won the world junior lightweight boxing championship in a bout against title holder Johnny Dundee before a crowd of 15,000 people at the Velodrome at New York's Coney Island. Bernstein, an underground, was the unanimous choice as the winner after 15 rounds of fighting.
- Born:
  - Jimmy Lydon, popular American actor who starred as teenager Henry Aldrich in nine "Henry Aldrich" films from 1941 to 1944, starting with Henry Aldrich for President; in Harrington Park, New Jersey (d. 2022)
  - Madeline Lee Gilford, American film and stage actress blacklisted during the McCarthy Era, later a Broadway theater producer; as Madeline Lederman in the Bronx, New York City (d. 2008)
- Died: Camille Chevillard, 63, French composer and conductor

== May 31, 1923 (Thursday) ==
- U.S. sports promoter Tex Rickard incorporated the New Madison Square Garden Corporation for the purpose of building a larger Madison Square Garden arena at a location away from Madison Square in New York City. Construction would be completed in 1925. The corporation was the forerunner of MSG Sports Corporation conglomerate.
- Pipe Spring in Arizona was made a National Monument.
- The Petrograd Opera House in Soviet Russia burned after one of the performers had a dress that caught fire. In the scramble for the exits, an undetermined number of people were killed and injured.
- A mob of 3,000 people in the city of Durango in Mexico attempted to invade the state government offices a day before a new state law was to go into effect limiting the number of ministers to 25 apiece for each Christian denomination. The new rules disqualified 90% of the 250 Roman Catholic priests in the state of Durango and the mob demanded that the state legislature repeal the legislation. At least three policemen and seven civilians were killed in the rioting that followed.
- Born: Rainier III, monarch of the European principality of Monaco; in Monte Carlo (d. 2005)
- Died: Walther Kadow, 23, German schoolteacher was kidnapped, beaten and then murdered by a group of Nazi Party activists led by future death camp operator Rudolf Höss, after being suspected of providing French authorities with information leading to the arrest and execution of another Nazi, Albert Leo Schlageter. Kadow was taken to a forest near the town of Parchim, now located in Germany's Mecklenburg-Vorpommern state, and tortured before his throat was slit.
