= George Montague =

British gay rights activist (1923–2022)

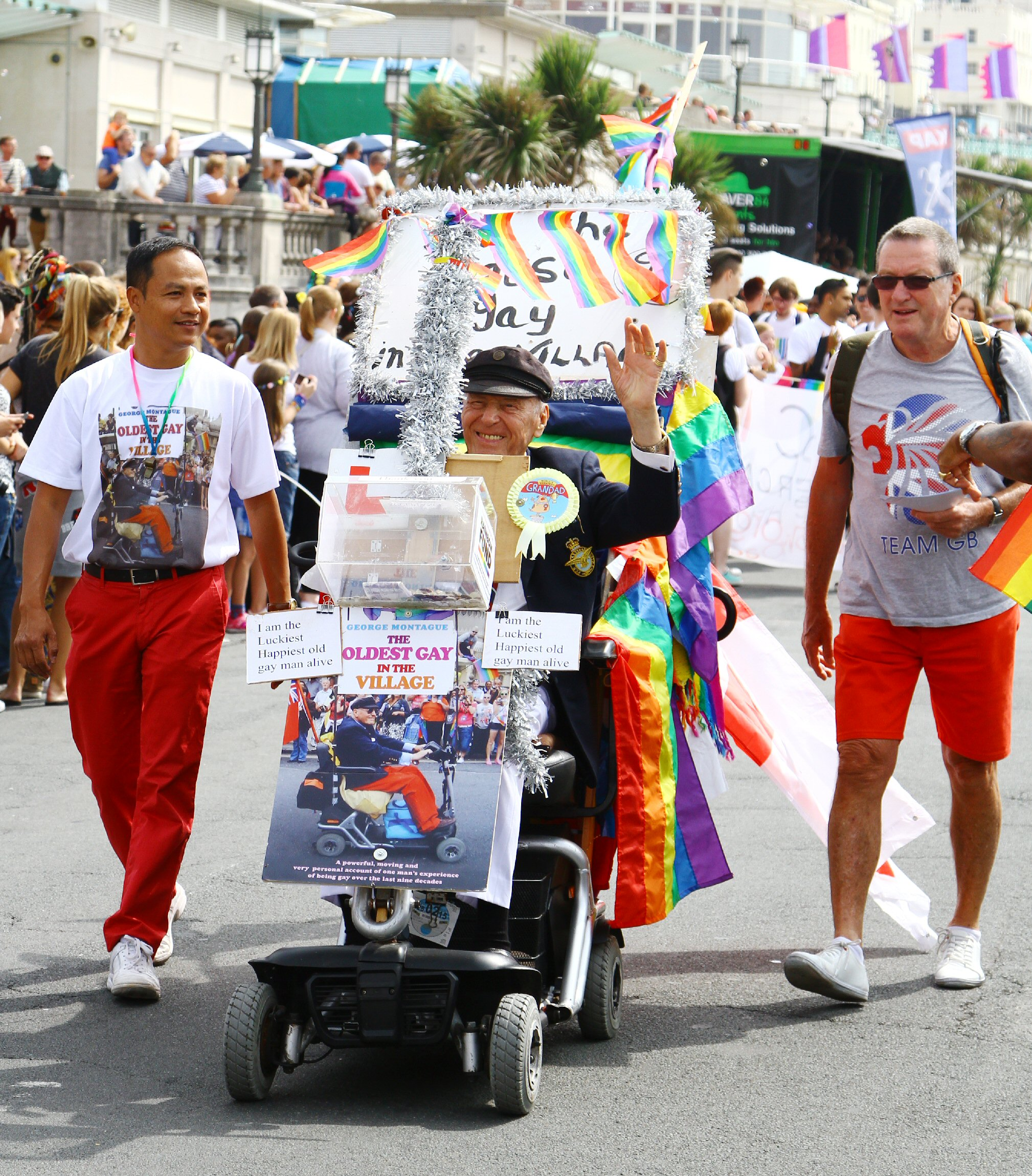
- George Montague at Brighton Pride in 2014
- Born: 5 June 1923; Hackney, London, England
- Died: 18 March 2022 (aged 98); Brighton, East Sussex, England
- Other names: 'The Oldest Gay in the Village'

George Montague (5 June 1923 – 18 March 2022) was a British gay rights activist, known as the 'Oldest Gay in the Village'.

== Life and legacy ==
Montague was born in Hackney, London on 5 June 1923, as the son of George Montague and Nellie New. He was raised in Hitcham, Buckinghamshire.

In 1974, Montague was convicted of gross indecency with a man, which was repealed in 2004. However, he challenged the government for an apology, and won, finally receiving an apology from the Home Office in 2017. He told the BBC that "It really made my day, I was over the moon."

Despite this, he was most prominently known for his iconic appearances at Brighton Pride, where he was seen on his mobility scooter, draped in rainbows, holding a sign which read 'Im the oldest gay in the village'. This soon became his nickname, and is from the Little Britain catchphrase 'I'm the only gay in the village'.

In 2015, Montague appeared on the cover of Attitude magazine's July issue, which was the magazine's 21st birthday special.

== Death ==
Montague died on 18 March 2022 at his home in Brighton from Alzheimer's. His funeral was on 11 April 2022, where there was a procession through the city, which closely followed the Brighton Pride parade route, eventually ending at Downs Crematorium on Bear Road. His hearse had colourful flowers and his iconic sign in the back window. The hearse was followed by a special double-decker bus decked out in pride colours. His husband Somchai Phukkai, who was by his side when he passed, said that he was "privileged to have been part of his life" and that "George was a very loving, caring person." Paul Kemp, the director of Brighton Pride, said he was "a lovely spirit" who "died a happy man".
