= Ivan Kabalin =

Ivan Andreyevich Kabalin
- Иван Андреевич Кабалин
- Born: 10 June 1923; Aleksandrovka village, Chuvash Autonomous Oblast, RSFSR, Soviet Union
- Died: 15 November 1982 (aged 59); Kanash, Russia
- Military career
- Allegiance: Soviet Union
- Branch: Soviet Army
- Service years: 1942–1955
- Rank: Junior lieutenant
- Unit: 25th Guards Rifle Division
- Conflicts: World War II; Battle of Kursk; Battle of the Dnieper
- Awards: Hero of the Soviet Union; Order of Lenin; Order of the Red Banner; Order of the Patriotic War, 2nd class

Ivan Andreyevich Kabalin (Russian: Иван Андреевич Кабалин; 10 June 1923 – 15 November 1982) was a Soviet Army junior lieutenant and Hero of the Soviet Union. Kabalin was a sergeant and a squad leader in a mortar company during the Battle of the Dnieper and was awarded the title Hero of the Soviet Union for reportedly killing 250 German soldiers while repulsing counterattacks. Kabalin stayed in the army postwar and retired in 1955 as a junior lieutenant. He worked as a turner and then director of a carriage works after graduating from a railway college.

== Early life ==
Kabalin was born on 10 June 1923 in Alexandrovka village in the Chuvash Autonomous Oblast to a working-class family. He graduated from seventh grade in 1940. After graduation, Kabalin and his family moved to Kanash, where he worked as a turner at the Kanash Car Repair Plant.

== World War II ==
In May 1942, Kabalin was drafted into the Red Army. He fought in combat from July 1942. He became a squad leader of a mortar company in the 25th Guards Rifle Division's 78th Guards Rifle Regiment. Kabalin fought in the Battle of Kursk and the Belgorod-Khar'kov Offensive Operation during the summer of 1943. On 1 October, Kabalin was awarded the Order of the Red Banner. In October, the regiment fought in the Battle of the Dnieper. On 23 October 1943, he reportedly killed 250 German soldiers and suppressed five machine gun positions while repulsing counterattacks during the defense of a bridgehead north of Zaporizhia. For his actions, Kabalin was awarded the title Hero of the Soviet Union and the Order of Lenin on 22 February 1944.

Kabalin fought through the rest of the war with the division. On 25 February 1944, he was awarded the Order of the Patriotic War 2nd class.

== Postwar ==
After the end of the war, Kabalin continued to serve in the Soviet Army. In 1955, he retired with the rank of junior lieutenant. He graduated from the Alatyr Railway College the year before. He worked as a turner and later became director of the Kanash Carriage Works. Kabalin died on 15 November 1982.
