= Book trimming =

Stage in book production process

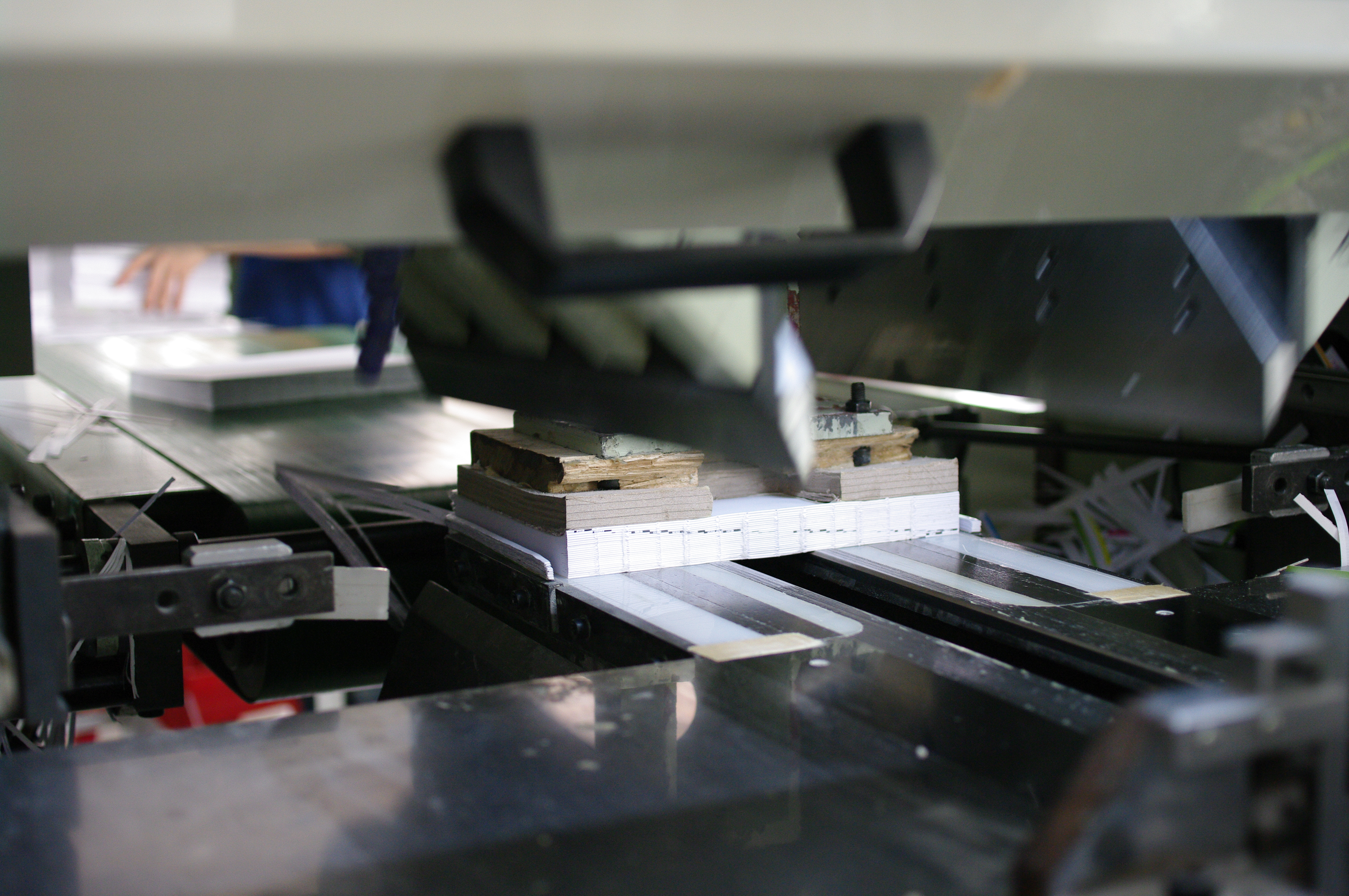
Automatic book trimming machine cutting two sides at once

Book trimming is the stage of the book production process in which the page edges of a book are trimmed so that all pages will stack with perfect edge alignment within the finished book jacket.

The step before book trimming is the binding of the folded printing sheets. Trimming is performed either with a hydraulic book trimmer that is able to cut a whole book in one or two passes or, until the invention of hydraulic book trimmers, with a cutting press (or lying press) and plough.

== Cutting principles ==
=== Knife cut principle ===
The book-cutting machine works with three knives and uses the knife-cut principle. The knife-cut principle operates with only one knife per edge which cuts against a rubber surface. This surface supports the cut force. The three-knife-trim is performed in one step. The block is aligned and fixed by the pressure bar. The three knives cut all edges except the spine; new machines need only one step.

=== Shear cut principle ===
The shear cut principle works with two knives – upper and bottom knife. The bottom knife is fixed and the upper knife works against the fixed one. Example of the shear cut principle is the cut of the paper web in the web offset machine and this is realized by a circular blade. To cut simple brochures (booklets) is used by a trimmer which works in two steps.

=== Burst cut ===
The third principle is the burst cut. This knife does not need a counter-acting tool. The required cut force is generated by the clamping force of the clamped paper.

== See also ==
- Book publishing
- Bookbinding
- Bleed (printing)
