= List of shipwrecks in March 1923 =

The list of shipwrecks in March 1923 includes ships sunk, foundered, grounded, or otherwise lost during March 1923.

== 3 March ==
List of shipwrecks: 3 March 1923
Ship	State	Description
Babinda	United States	The cargo ship caught fire at San Francisco, California and was abandoned.
Hieronymus	Danzig	The auxiliary sailing ship foundered in the Skaggerak off Hanstholm, Denmark. Her crew were rescued by Aalborg (Denmark).

== 5 March ==
List of shipwrecks: 5 March 1923
Ship	State	Description
Yunur	Norway	The cargo ship was driven ashore on the Westman Islands, Iceland and was wrecked. Her crew were rescued.

== 7 March ==
List of shipwrecks: 7 March 1923
Ship	State	Description
Monte	United Kingdom	The auxiliary sailing ship came ashore at Mandal, Norway and was wrecked.

== 8 March ==
List of shipwrecks: 8 March 1923
Ship	State	Description
Mindini	United Kingdom	The cargo liner ran aground at Samarai, New Guinea. Her passengers and crew were rescued by Nauru Chief (United Kingdom).

== 9 March ==
List of shipwrecks: 9 March 1923
Ship	State	Description
Rigel	Finland	The cargo ship was sunk by ice 10 nautical miles (19 km) off Mariehamn.

== 10 March ==
List of shipwrecks: 10 March 1923
Ship	State	Description
Blazer	United States	After a coil of tow line washed off her deck during a gale and fouled her propeller and her crew was unable to clear it from the propeller, the 48-gross register ton motor vessel – bound from Kodiak to Kanatak, Territory of Alaska – was washed onto the beach and broke up near Portage Bay (57°34′05″N 156°02′15″W) on the Alaska Peninsula 4 nautical miles (7.4 km; 4.6 mi) southwest of Kanatak. Her crew of three survived.

== 12 March ==
List of shipwrecks: 12 March 1923
Ship	State	Description
Marjane	France	The trawler was sunk in the Mediterranean Sea off Hyères, Var by the explosion of a mine which had caught in her nets. Two of her crew were killed.

== 14 March ==
List of shipwrecks: 14 March 1923
Ship	State	Description
Cape Cod	United States	The cargo ship a struck rock in Long Island Sound and was beached on Plum Island.
Ranee	Straits Settlements	The cargo/passenger ship was sunk in a collision with Boribat off Johore, Malaya. Fourteen crew and 17 passengers died.

== 15 March ==
List of shipwrecks: 15 March 1923
Ship	State	Description
Eastway	United Kingdom	The cargo ship was wrecked at Lourenço Marques, Mozambique with the loss of two of her crew. Survivors were rescued by a tug.
Merville	United Kingdom	The cargo ship foundered in the North Sea with the loss of thirteen of her fifteen crew. Survivors were rescued by Frithjof Eide (Norway).

== 16 March ==
List of shipwrecks: 16 March 1923
Ship	State	Description
Levanzo	Italy	The passenger ship ran aground off Elba. Her passengers were transferred to Bali, Ischia and Massaua (all Italy). She sank on 3 April.

== 17 March ==
List of shipwrecks: 17 March 1923
Ship	State	Description
Banhei Maru No.2	Japan	The cargo ship foundered off Yokohama.
Buckleigh	United Kingdom	The cargo ship ran aground in Jones Inlet, New York. She was refloated on 31 March.
Freia	Uruguay	The cargo ship caught fire at La Boca, Buenos Aires, Argentina. She broke free from her moorings and sank.

== 18 March ==
List of shipwrecks: 18 March 1923
Ship	State	Description
Maid of Sparta	United Kingdom	The cargo ship ran aground on Samsø, Denmark (56°04′N 11°00′E) and was abandoned by her crew. She was refloated on 22 March.

== 19 March ==
List of shipwrecks: 19 March 1923
Ship	State	Description
Shannonmede	United Kingdom	The cargo ship was driven ashore at Tenerife, Canary Islands, Spain.

== 20 March ==
List of shipwrecks: 20 March 1923
Ship	State	Description
Peiho	Germany	The schooner came ashore 10 nautical miles (19 km) north of Cape San Diego, Argentina. Twenty four crew landed on New Year Island.

== 21 March ==
List of shipwrecks: 21 March 1923
Ship	State	Description
Bohemia	United Kingdom	The schooner was abandoned in the Atlantic Ocean (45°00′N 55°13′W).
Giulia	Italy	The cargo ship sprang a leak in the Atlantic Ocean (41°37′N 58°37′W). She was subsequently abandoned.

== 22 March ==
List of shipwrecks: 22 March 1923
Ship	State	Description
Texan	United States	The cargo ship came ashore on Block Island, Rhode Island. She was refloated on 28 March.

== 23 March ==
List of shipwrecks: 23 March 1923
Ship	State	Description
USS Coastal Battleship No. 4	United States Navy	Coastal Battleship No. 4 The target ship (formerly the battleship USS Iowa) was sunk in the Gulf of Panama by the battleship USS Mississippi (United States Navy).

== 25 March ==
List of shipwrecks: 25 March 1923
Ship	State	Description
Felix	France	The schooner was abandoned in the Atlantic Ocean (47°56′N 11°54′W). She was set afire by her crew, who were rescued by Nolisment (France).

== 26 March ==
List of shipwrecks: 26 March 1923
Ship	State	Description
Aspen	United Kingdom	The cargo ship ran aground between Formby and Southport, Lancashire. She was refloated on 30 March.
Marco Aurelio	Italy	The cargo ship was abandoned in the Cerigo Channel.
Rey Jaime I	Spain	The cargo liner ran aground at Livorno, Tuscany, Italy. Her passengers were taken off. She was refloated on 29 March.
Taishin Maru	Japan	The cargo ship ran aground on the west coast of the Kwantung Peninsula and was abandoned by her crew.

== 27 March ==
List of shipwrecks: 27 March 1923
Ship	State	Description
Amy Turner	United Kingdom	The barquentine foundered off Guam with the loss of ten of her fourteen crew. Survivors reached landed at Hinuatan, Philippines after 24 days.
Charles F. Gordon	United Kingdom	The schooner was wrecked at Double Head, Cuba. Her crew were rescued.
F. C. Lockhart	United Kingdom	The schooner ran aground on Lippy Island, Maine, United States and was a total loss.
Madelon	France	The 191 GRT schooner was destroyed by fire 70 miles west northwest of the Bishop's Rock. Her crew was rescued by the trawler Capstone (United Kingdom).
Rusholme	United Kingdom	The cargo ship struck rocks 28 nautical miles (52 km) south of Port Nolloth, South Africa and was a total loss. Her crew survived.

== 28 March ==
List of shipwrecks: 28 March 1923
Ship	State	Description
Julian J. Fleetwood	United States	The tow steamer foundered in 17 feet (5.2 m) of water at the mouth of the North River at the entrance to Albemarle Sound. Four of her crew died of exposure on the roof of the pilothouse, two survivors were rescued from the roof by Annie L. Vansciver (United States) on the 29th.

== 31 March ==
List of shipwrecks: 31 March 1923
Ship	State	Description
Chaldon	United Kingdom	The cargo ship struck a rock in the Pentland Firth and was beached at Scrabster, Caithness. She was refloated on 3 April.
Gladys M. Hollet	United Kingdom	The schooner was abandoned in the Atlantic Ocean off Cape Race, Newfoundland. Her crew were rescued.
