= List of shipwrecks in April 1923 =

The list of shipwrecks in April 1923 includes ships sunk, foundered, grounded, or otherwise lost during April 1923.

== 1 April ==
List of shipwrecks: 1 April 1923
Ship	State	Description
Laurana	Germany	The cargo ship ran aground at Cádiz, Andalusia, Spain. She was refloated but was discovered to be leaking severely and was beached. Laurana was refloated on 16 April.
Portgwarra	United Kingdom	The cargo ship ran aground at Melilla, Spain. She was refloated on 16 April.

== 3 April ==
List of shipwrecks: 3 April 1923
Ship	State	Description
HMS Ceres	Royal Navy	The C-class cruiser was in collision with USS Fox (United States Navy) in the Bosporus. Both vessels sustained substantial damage.
Free Will	United Kingdom	The salvage vessel was holed during salvage operations at Portland, Dorset and was beached. Her crew were taken off by Conqueress and Petrel (both United Kingdom).
Reta M. Cluett	United Kingdom	The schooner was abandoned in the Atlantic Ocean off Cape Race, Newfoundland (40°05′N 53°38′W). She was set afire by her crew before they were rescued.

== 5 April ==
List of shipwrecks: 5 April 1923
Ship	State	Description
Glutra	Norway	The cargo ship foundered in the North Sea. Her crew were rescued by the trawler Este Brügge (Germany).

== 6 April ==
List of shipwrecks: 6 April 1923
Ship	State	Description
Chika Maru	Japan	The cargo ship ran aground and sank in the Kurushima Channel. She was refloated on 22 April.
Competitor	United Kingdom	The cargo ship ran aground at Cape Cod, Massachusetts. She was refloated on 16 April.
John S. Dwight	United States	While smuggling a cargo of illegal ale, the 107-foot (33 m), 151-gross register ton coastal cargo ship — the former minesweeper USS Pawnee (United States Navy) — was scuttled by her crew under mysterious circumstances in 85 feet (26 m) of water off the coast of Massachusetts in Vineyard Sound south of Nashawena Island at 41°23′26″N 070°52′36″W. Eight members of her crew died in the incident. The minesweeper USS Falcon (United States Navy) blew up her sunken wreck during the summer of 1923, sometime prior to 5 July.
Nordhvalen	Denmark	The cargo ship was sunk in a collision with Barracoo (United Kingdom) near the mouth of the Patapsco River in Chesapeake Bay.

== 7 April ==
List of shipwrecks: 7 April 1923
Ship	State	Description
Addington	United Kingdom	The cargo ship ran aground in the Danube at Sulina, Romania. She was refloated on 11 April.

== 8 April ==
List of shipwrecks: 8 April 1923
Ship	State	Description
Unicorn	United Kingdom	. The coaster foundered off Rame Head, Cornwall with the loss of three of her five crew.

== 9 April ==
List of shipwrecks: 9 April 1923
Ship	State	Description
Pioneer #2	United States	During a voyage from Bellingham, Washington, to Snug Harbor, Territory of Alaska, under tow by the steamer North Star (United States) with no people or cargo aboard, the 21-ton scow sank off Cape Hinchinbrook (60°14′N 146°39′W) in Southeast Alaska after her tow line parted during a gale.

== 17 April ==
List of shipwrecks: 17 April 1923
Ship	State	Description
Cité d'Aleth	France	The schooner was abandoned in the Atlantic Ocean (46°47′00″N 6°46′30″W). Her crew were rescued by Drake (United Kingdom).

== 21 April ==
List of shipwrecks: 21 April 1923
Ship	State	Description
The Gay Gordon	Newfoundland	The schooner foundered in the Atlantic Ocean (41°40′N 41°55′W). Her crew were rescued by Hollinside (United Kingdom).

== 23 April ==
List of shipwrecks: 23 April 1923
Ship	State	Description
Stranger	United States	The schooner was destroyed by fire in the Gulf of Mexico. Her crew were rescued.

== 24 April ==
List of shipwrecks: 24 April 1923
Ship	State	Description
Mossamedes	Portugal	The cargo ship, with 237 people on board, ran aground at Cape Frio, Namíbia, and was evacuated by lifeboats. She was a total loss. Thirty-one died, seven when the Mossamedes capsized and 24 others who were in a lifeboat that sank. The 206 survivors were picked up by the French gunboat Cassiopee, the Portuguese gunboat Salvador Correia and by fishing vessels from Porto Alexandre in Angola.

== 25 April ==
List of shipwrecks: 25 April 1923
Ship	State	Description
Maschyagandhi	United Kingdom	The barque foundered in the Bay of Bengal. Her crew survived.
Teja	Chile	The cargo ship struck rocks off Punta de Lobos and sank.

== 26 April ==
List of shipwrecks: 26 April 1923
Ship	State	Description
Brush	United States	The cargo ship ran aground at the South Cape Arago Lighthouse, Oregon. Her crew were rescued by a United States Coast Guard ship.

== 29 April ==
List of shipwrecks: 29 April 1923
Ship	State	Description
Seaconnet	United States	Carrying a cargo of coal, the 3,372-gross register ton collier sank during a storm with the loss of seven lives in 75 to 100 feet (23 to 30 m) of water off the coast of Massachusetts in Vineyard Sound southwest of Cuttyhunk Island at 41°21′48″N 070°00′10″W.

== Unknown date ==
List of shipwrecks: Unknown date 1923
Ship	State	Description
Dunmail	United Kingdom	The ship foundered in the Bristol Channel. Her crew were rescued by Thamesmead (United Kingdom).
