= April 1923 =

Month of 1923

<<	April 1923					>>
Su	Mo	Tu	We	Th	Fr	Sa
1	2	3	4	5	6	7
8	9	10	11	12	13	14
15	16	17	18	19	20	21
22	23	24	25	26	27	28
29	30

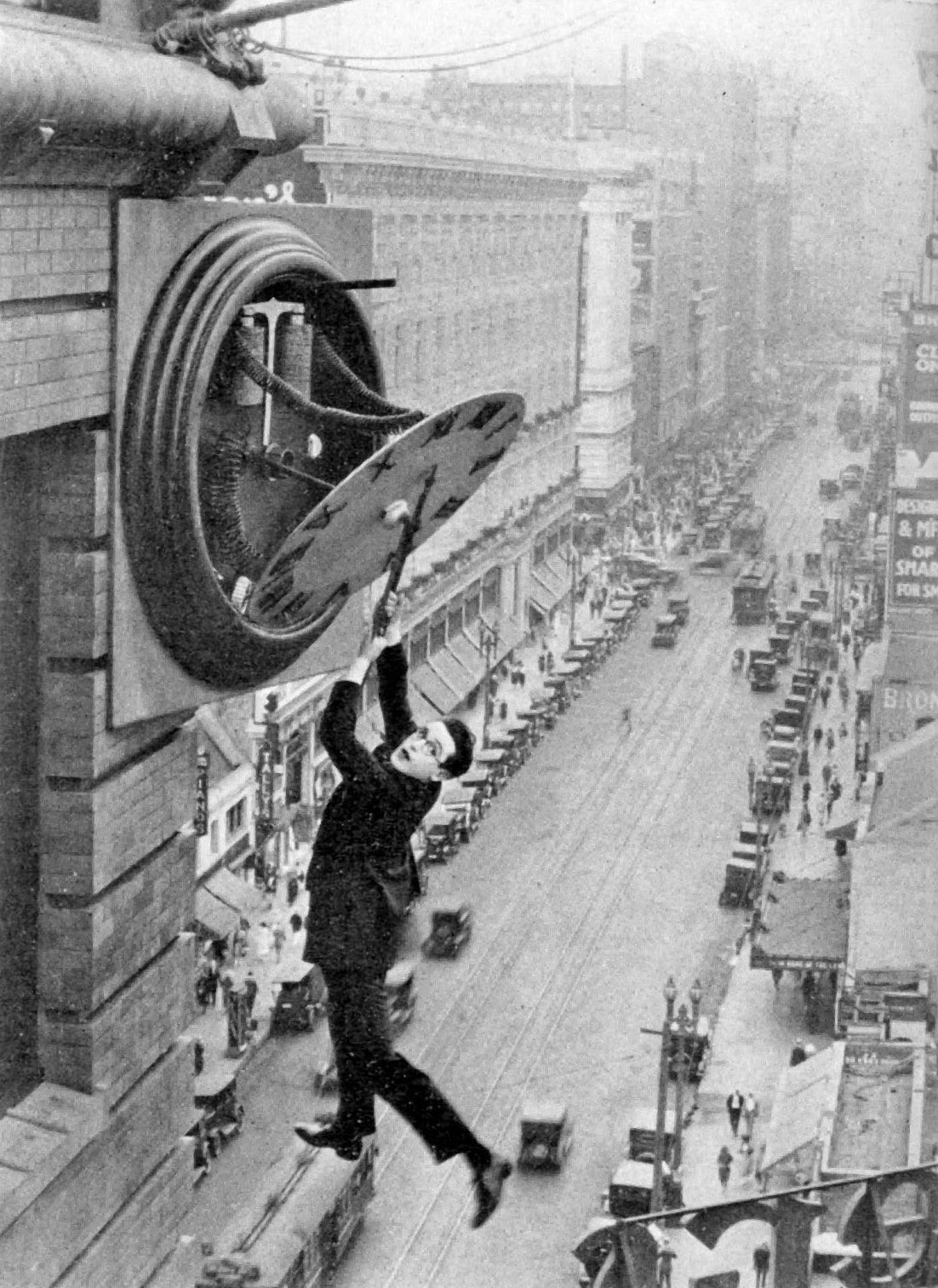
April 1, 1923: Actor Harold Lloyd stuns audience in Safety Last!

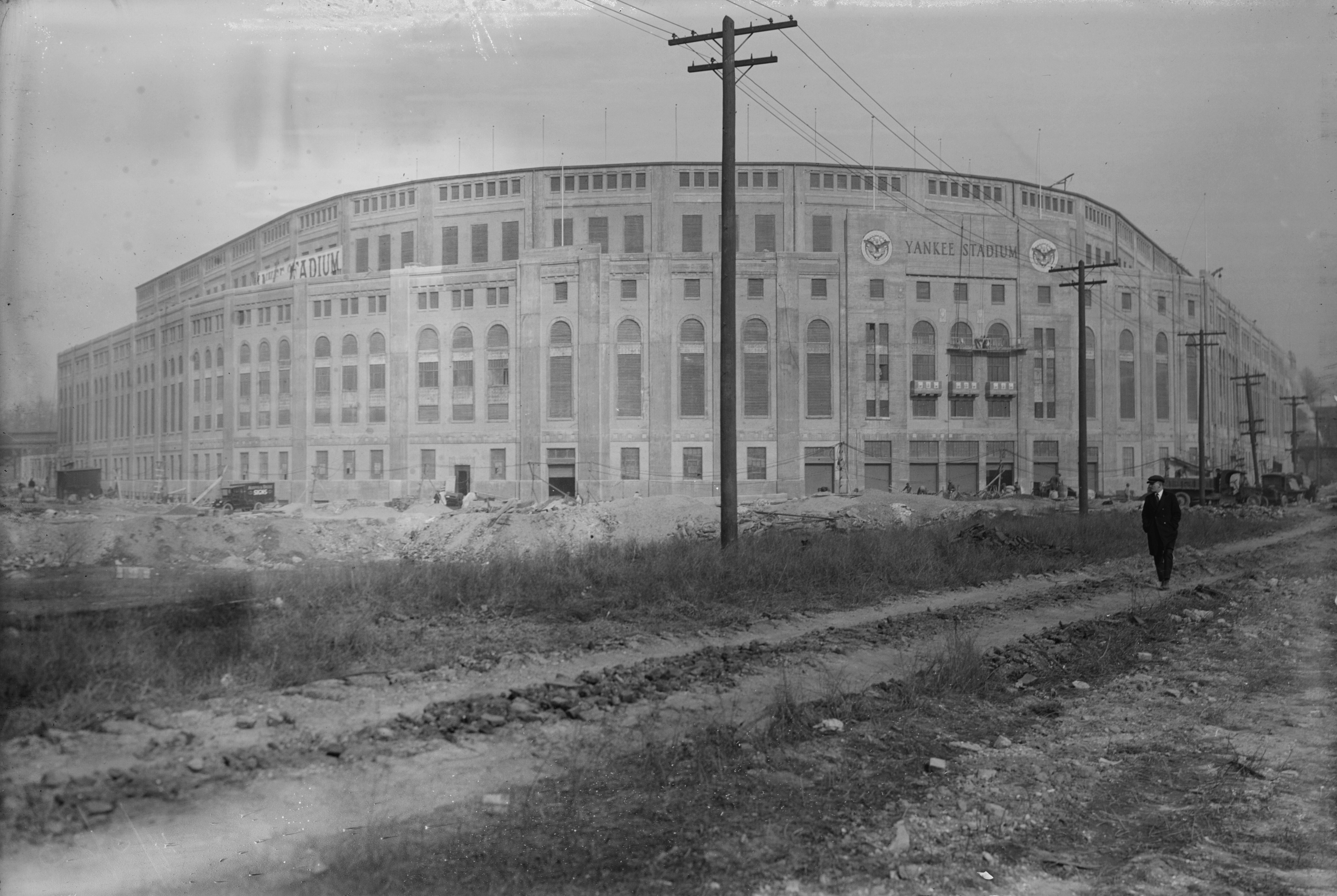
April 18, 1923: Yankee Stadium opens its gates

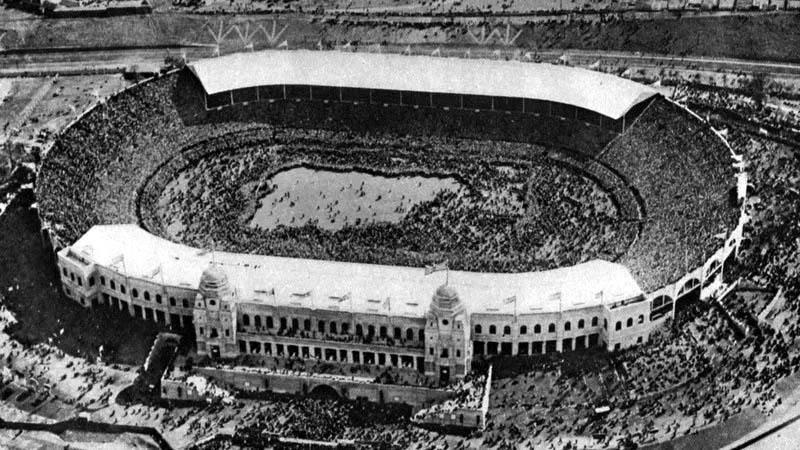
April 28, 1923: Wembley Stadium opens its gates

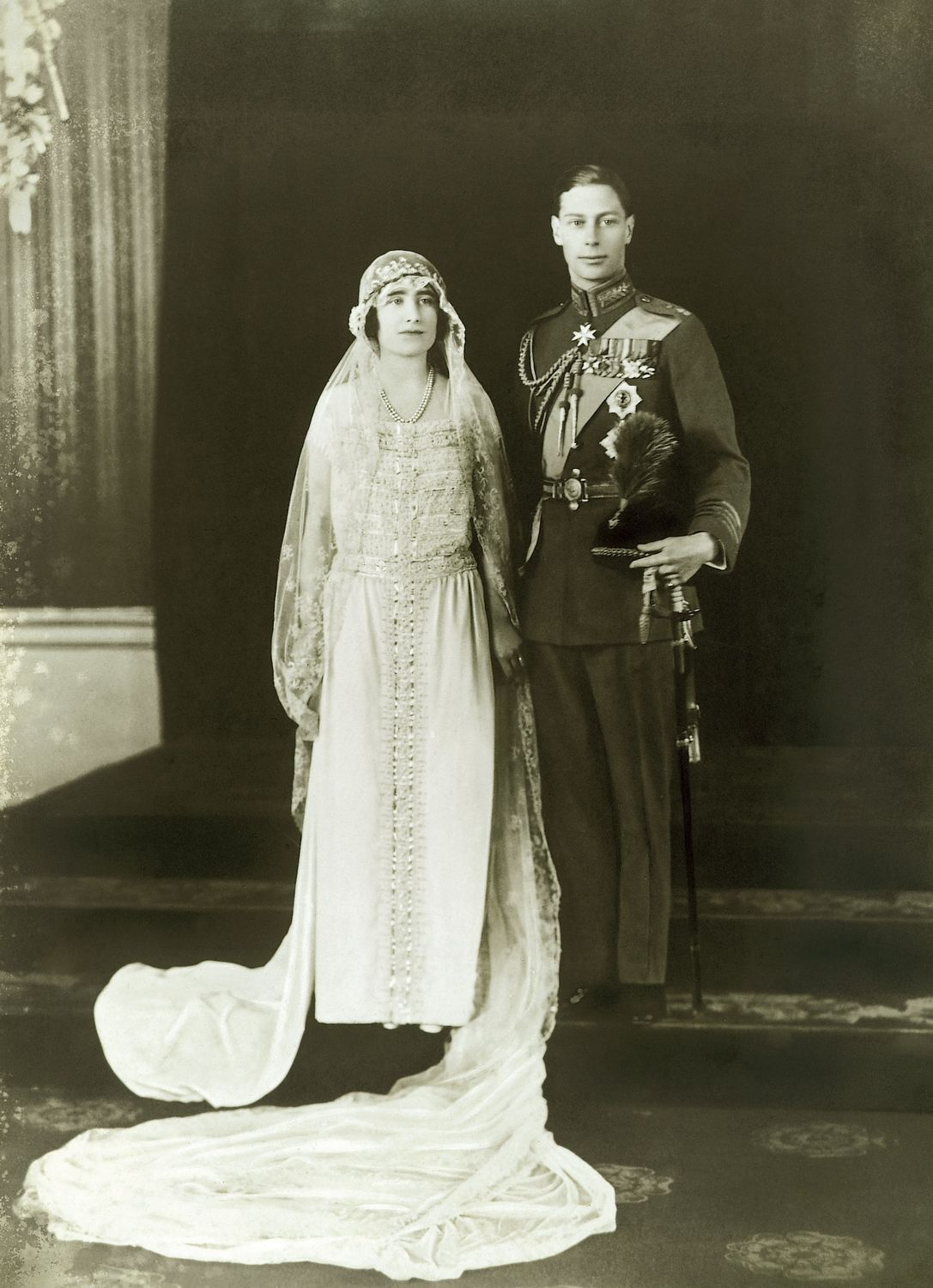
April 26, 1923: Prince Albert and Lady Elizabeth are married at Westminster

The following events occurred in April 1923:

== April 1, 1923 (Sunday) ==
- The romantic comedy film Safety Last!, starring Harold Lloyd and Mildred Davis, premiered at the Strand Theatre in New York City. This film features one of the most famous scenes of the silent movie era: Lloyd clutching the hands of a large clock while dangling from the outside of a skyscraper. A reviewer for The New York Times wrote, "Harold Lloyd's latest effort is filled with laughs and gasps... Although laughter follows quickly on the heels of each thrill, the thrill lasts long enough for a man to feel that dizzy feeling when looking down from a height of twelve stories."
- Great Britain began the numbering of the nation's highways and published a list of those for which signs would be placed.
- France reduced the length of compulsory military service from two years to 18 months.
- Four directors of the Krupp works were arrested by French authorities and charged with inciting their workers in the altercation of the previous day.
- A woman at the Audubon Ballroom in New York City broke the existing record for longest marathon dance, stopping at 9:57 in the evening after having danced continuously for 27 consecutive hours. Alma Stappenback Cummings, 32, of San Antonio, Texas, went through six different partners, each of whom quit from exhaustion. After breaking Victor Hindmarch's record of 25 hours set in March, Ms. Cummings went two hours more before quitting, and won the prize by the sponsors. The record would be surpassed two weeks later.
- Died: Prince Naruhisa Kitashirakawa of Japan, 35, was killed in an auto accident while in France, as he drove through the Paris suburb of Perriers-la-Campagne. (b. 1887)

== April 2, 1923 (Monday) ==
- Paterson F.C. of Paterson, New Jersey won the U.S Football Association title, emblematic of the American national soccer football championship. The victory came, not on the field, but "at the office of Thomas Cahill, secretary of the U. S. F. A., 126 Nassau Street" in New York City the day after Paterson and the defending champions, St. Louis Scullin Steel F.C. had played to a 2 to 2 draw in the National Challenge Cup Final. "Late in the afternoon," The New York Times noted, "the announcement was made that the Scullins, champions for 1922, forfeited their right to the championship and yielded the title to the Paterson football club," following deliberations in person and by telegram between four members of a committee of officials. The day before, Paterson had overcome a 0 to 2 deficit with two goals in the final 25 minutes, the tying score coming in the 84th minute of play, "six minutes from full-time", when John "Rabbit" Hemingsley got the ball past St. Louis goalkeeper Harry "Dutch" Oellerman. After two extra periods, the game had been called because of darkness and a replay ordered for April 8 in Harrison. With four stars of St. Louis being professional baseball players as well (including Oellerman), and three other players injured, Manager A. J. Brady announced that the team would surrender its title.
- The day after the arrest by the French Army of four directors of Germany's Krupp arms factory, 50,000 employees threatened to go on strike if the men were not released.
- Born:
  - Alice Haylett, American professional baseball pitcher for the Grand Rapids Chicks in the All-American Girls Professional Baseball League, 1948 league leader in earned run average leader (0.77) and wins (25 and 3 record); in Coldwater, Michigan (d. 2004)
  - Gloria Henry, American actress, best known for her role as Alice Mitchel in the sitcom Dennis the Menace; as Gloria Eileen McEniry, in New Orleans(d. 2021)
  - Yolanda Marculescu, Romanian opera soprano and diva of the Romanian National Opera; as Iolanda Mărculescu, in Bucharest, Kingdom of Romania (d. 1992)
  - G. Spencer-Brown, English polymath; as George Spencer-Brown, in Grimsby, Lincolnshire (d. 2016)
- Died: Osman Agca, 39-40, Turkish politician and former adviser to Turkish leader Kemal Ataturk, was killed along with 12 of his followers during an attempt to arrest him for the March 27 murder of parliamentary deputy Ali Chukri Bey. (b. 1883)

== April 3, 1923 (Tuesday) ==
- The Soviet Union announced that Konstantin Budkevich had been executed on March 31.
- Closing arguments were presented in the William Z. Foster trial.
- The Republic of Turkey lowered the legal voting age from 21 to 18 and removed the poll tax requirement in advance of the June 28 parliamentary election.

== April 4, 1923 (Wednesday) ==
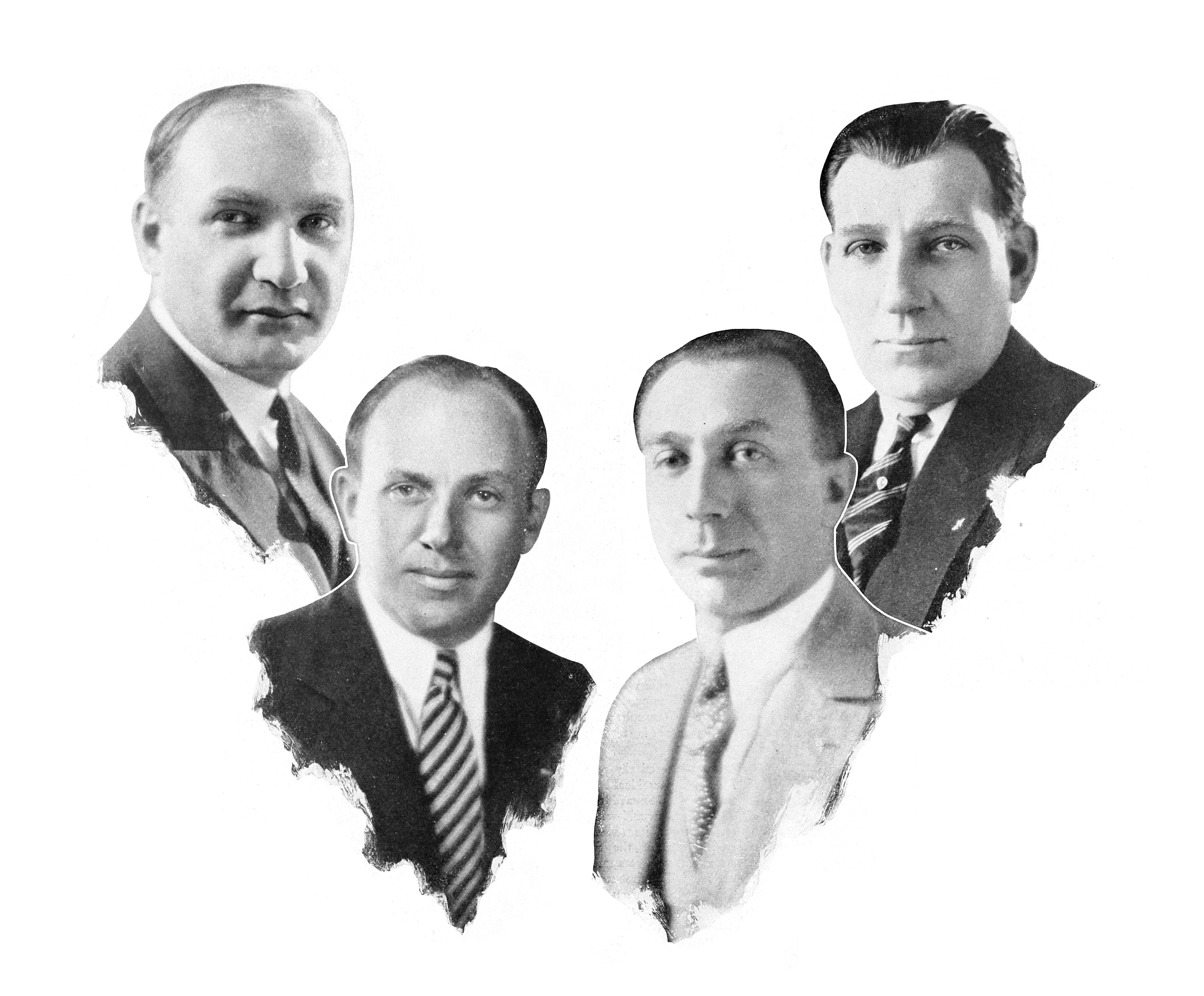
Albert, Jack, Harry and Sam Warner, founders of Warner Bros.
- The Warner Bros. company, now a multi-billion dollar corporation, was incorporated by four brothers, Harry Warner, Albert Warner, Sam Warner (born in Poland as Hirsz, Aaron and Szmuel Wonsal) and Jack L. Warner (born in Canada after the family emigrated from Poland).
- The first Tanager Expedition began with the departure from Honolulu of the minesweeper USS Tanager to survey and catalog the animals, plants and archaeological sites of the northwestern Hawaiian Islands territory as part of a biological expedition in a partnership between the Bishop Museum, the Bureau of Biological Survey of the U.S. Fish and Wildlife Service, and the United States Navy.
- Adolf Hitler told the Chicago Tribune that rumors he was planning a march on Berlin to overthrow the government were "fairy tales" and asserted that his only fight was against bolshevism.
- Born:
  - Peter Vaughan, English actor; as Peter Ewart Ohm, in Wem, Shropshire (d. 2016)
  - Gene Reynolds, American screenwriter and producer, best known for the TV series M*A*S*H; as Eugene Reynolds Blumenthal, in Cleveland (d. 2020)
- Died: John Venn, 88, English logician and philosopher known for creating the Venn diagram (b. 1834)

== April 5, 1923 (Thursday) ==
- The trial of William Z. Foster, leader of the Communist Party of the United States, ended in a hung jury. The 12 members were deadlocked 6 to 6 after 31 hours of deliberation, and Judge Charles E. White declared a mistrial. "The verdict is for the best", Foster told the media. "It is a victory for the jury, I think, in that they had the courage to stand that way. There must have been a mountain of prejudice against these ideas." Judge White announced that the trial of C. E. Ruthenberg, another of the 32 persons arrested along with Foster in August, would begin on April 16.
- Hjalmar Branting, the Prime Minister of Sweden, lost a vote of confidence in parliament, 76 to 60, prompting him and his cabinet to resign. Crown Prince Gustaf, acting as regent during the absence of his father on a vacation in France, asked Branting to continue until King Gustaf V could return to appoint a successor.
- Born:
  - Nguyen Van Thieu, Vietnamese military officer and politician, served as the President of South Vietnam from 1967 to 1975; in Phan Rang–Tháp Chàm, Annam, French Indochina (present-day Vietnam) (d. 2001)
  - Michael V. Gazzo, American playwright and actor, Academy Award nominee for his supporting role in The Godfather Part II; in Hillside, New Jersey (d. 1995)
- Died: George Herbert, 5th Earl of Carnarvon, 56, English aristocrat who had financed the expedition to find the tomb of Tutankamun, died of blood poisoning arising from an infected mosquito bite a few days before March 19 at Aswan, complicated by a razor blade cut. (b. 1866). His death, two months after the opening of the tomb, gave rise to the legend of the "curse of the pharaohs". Sir Arthur Conan Doyle, creator of the Sherlock Holmes mystery series, suggested to reporters that an evil spirit, or "elemental," might have induced the death of Lord Carnarvon. "The Egyptians had powers we know nothing of," he explained. "They easily may have used these powers, occult and otherwise, to defend their graves. They always opposed digging up the mummies."

== April 6, 1923 (Friday) ==
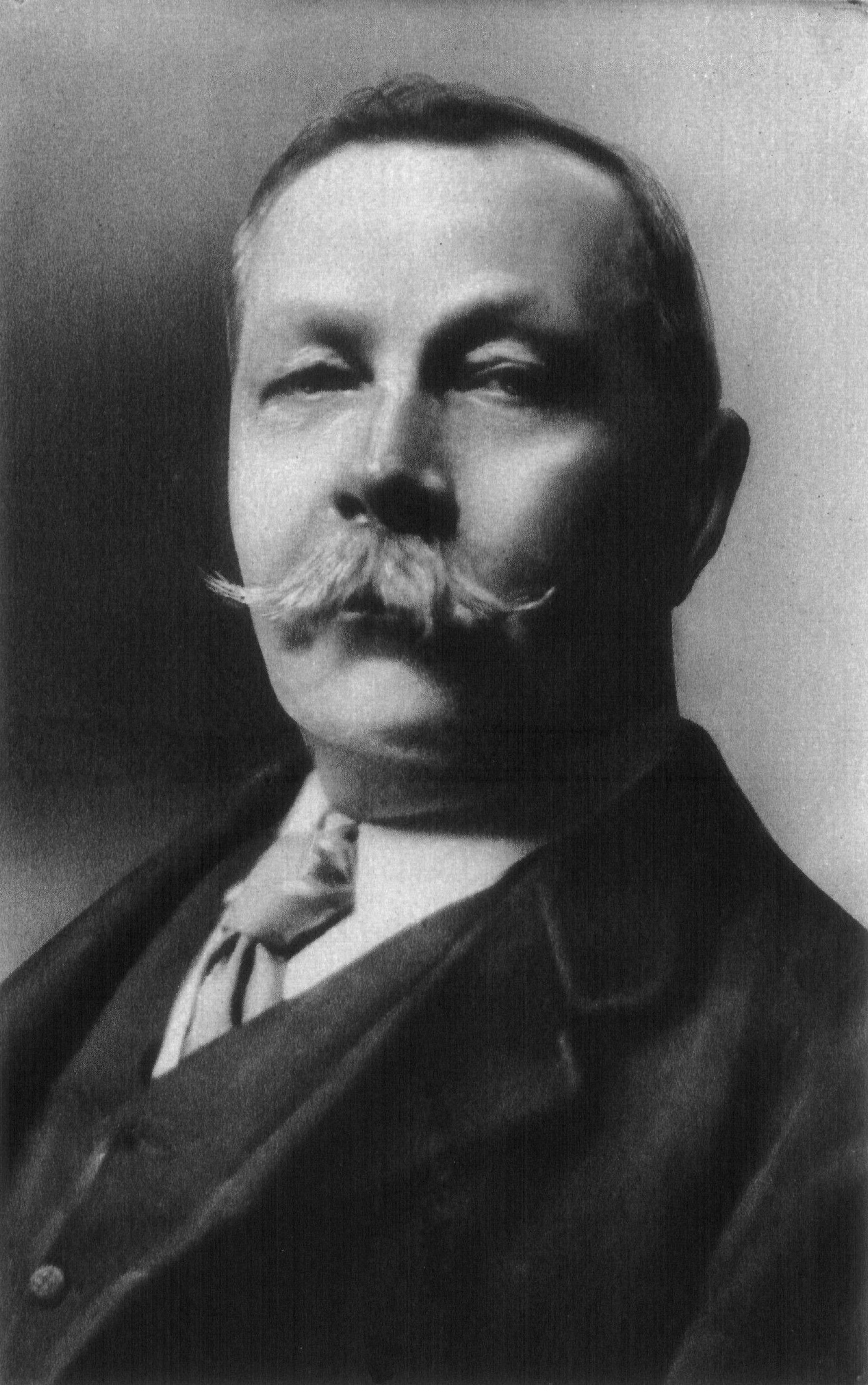
Arthur Conan Doyle

- Sir Arthur Conan Doyle gave a lecture at Carnegie Hall in New York City in which he displayed a series of "spirit photographs", including a pair taken at the Cenotaph in London at the time of the two-minute silence to England's war dead. One picture showed a faint luminous patch which Doyle described as "ectoplasm", and another showed what appeared to be ghostly faces floating above the crowd.
- The second Herrin Massacre trial ended in Marion, Illinois as the jury acquitted six defendants after almost seven hours of deliberation.
- Former Supreme Court Justice John Hessin Clarke said that only American entry into the League of Nations could keep Britain and France from going to war against each other in the future. "France and Britain have been enemies oftener than friends during the last 200 years", he explained. "It is plain truth to say that there has not been a time in modern history when two nations controlling the destiny of the world stood so much in need of an impartial counselor, guide, and friend to compose inevitable differences as they arise as Britain and France stand in need of each a one today."
- Louis Armstrong made his recording debut, with King Oliver's Creole Band on "Chimes Blues".
- Born:
  - Jimmy Roberts, American singer, known for The Lawrence Welk Show; as James Robert Heltsley, in Madisonville, Kentucky (d. 1999)
  - Dr. Rina Moore, New Zealander medical doctor, first female Maori physician; as Rina Ropiha, in Auckland(d. 1975)
  - Merna Barry, American singer, member of the jazz duo The Barry Sisters popular for singing Yiddish songs; as Minnie Bagelman, in the Bronx, New York City (d. 1976)
- Died:
  - Chwa II Kabalega, 69, Omukama of Bunyoro who led resistance against the British Empire in what is now Uganda, died while on his way home after 24 years of exile (b. 1853)
  - Harry Knapp, 66, Vice Admiral of the U.S. Navy and served as the U.S. Military Governor of Santo Domingo (now the Dominican Republic) from 1917 to 1918 during the U.S. administration of the island republic, died from heart disease. (b. 1856)

== April 7, 1923 (Saturday) ==
- Nine Irish Republicans were reported killed when government troops surrounded a house where they were meeting in Glencar, County Kerry.
- Land mines blew up a bridge in Dublin; two bridges over the River Fane were also blown up.
- The Soviet Union issued a statement distancing itself from the William Z. Foster affair, saying it took "no responsibility" for the actions of American communists because "the Russian government does not direct the affairs, plans or theories of the international communist contingent."
- Born: Mumtaz Begum, Indian character actress in Bollywood films; in Bombay, British India (present-day Mumbai (d. 2002)

== April 8, 1923 (Sunday) ==
- The Dynamo Sports Club, an all-Soviet Russian sports organization that was sponsored by the Soviet secret police, the GPU, was founded in Moscow at the initiative of GPU Director Felix Dzerzhinsky, initially with teams in soccer football (FC Dynamo Moscow), men's and women's basketball, water polo, fencing, shooting and bandy.
- Sir Arthur Conan Doyle lectured again at Carnegie Hall, describing a recent talk he had with the spirit of W. T. Stead, the British investigative journalist and newspaper editor who had died in the 1912 sinking of RMS Titanic. Doyle said that Stead advised him from the spirit world about the preface of a new book Doyle was writing.
- U.S. President Warren Harding returned to Washington after five weeks of vacation.
- Born:
  - Edward Mulhare, Irish-born American actor; in Cork, Irish Free State (present-day Ireland) (d. 1997)
  - Mary Printz, American answering service operator and assistant to celebrities, on whom the Broadway musical Bells Are Ringing was based; as Mary Selina Horn, in Grosse Pointe, Michigan (d. 2009)

== April 9, 1923 (Monday) ==
- Harvard University passed a resolution declaring that "men of the white and colored races shall not be compelled to live and eat together, nor shall any man be excluded by reason of his color."
- The U.S. Supreme Court decided Adkins v. Children's Hospital and Baltimore & Ohio Railroad Co. v. United States
- At a meeting of the International Olympic Committee in Rome, the 1932 Summer Olympics were awarded to Los Angeles. No other cities bid to host the games.
- Died:
  - Ranchhodbhai Dave, 85, Indian Gujarati language playwright and pioneer in Gujarati language literature (b. 1837)
  - Harry A. Black, 43, American politician who served as the Secretary of State of Vermont from 1919 until his death was killed by a Boston & Maine locomotive after fainting while walking across a railroad yard in Wells River, Vermont. (b. 1879)

== April 10, 1923 (Tuesday) ==
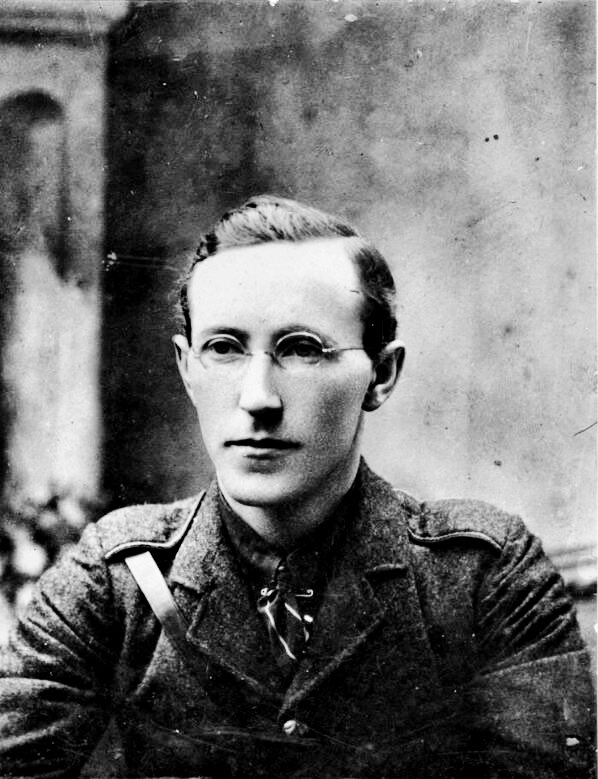
Liam Lynch

- General Liam Lynch, the Chief of Staff of the Irish Republican Army, was fatally wounded in an ambush by the Irish Free State Army at the Knockmealdown Mountains in County Tipperary, a pivotal moment that would bring an end to the Irish Civil War. Lynch and six IRA officials had learned that a unit of the National Army had discovered the location of his headquarters, and fled to prevent important papers from falling into the hands of the Free State. As the seven IRA members were avoiding the first unit, they ran into another Free State Army of 50 members approaching from the opposite direction. Lynch was struck by a rifle shot and ordered his men, including his aides Frank Aiken and Moss Twomey, to leave him behind and to get the documents to the rest of the IRA leadership. When the Free State party arrived to arrest him, Lynch was dying and asked to see a priest and a doctor. Wounded early in the morning, Lynch died at 8:45 in the evening.
- The Conservative government of British Prime Minister Bonar Law was defeated on a snap vote in the House of Commons, taken with many members absent following a dull debate on civil service estimates. With 283 present in the 615-member body, a Labour Party motion of confidence in the Law government was made; 138 members voted in favor of Law, and 145 against. Labour members gleefully called on the government to resign, but few took the vote seriously.
- The government of Turkey approved a concession to give the U.S. exclusive rights to develop oil fields and railway lines, after negotiations by a syndicate led by retired U.S. Navy Admiral Colby Mitchell Chester. Because of an estimate that the concession would require $300 million U.S. dollars to develop the concession, the U.S. Senate declined to ratify the treaty and Turkey rescinded the offer.
- The first ban on marathon dancing was issued in Sunderland, England when the mayor invoked an existing local regulation. The magistrate called the fad "an idiotic idea, verging on lunacy."
- Born:
  - Sir David Rose, Governor-General of Guyana from 1966 until his death in an accident in 1969; in Mahaica, British Guiana
  - Major General Sergey Kramarenko, Soviet Air Force flying ace in World War II and the Korean War; in Kalinovka, Ukrainian SSR, Soviet Union (d. 2020)
- Died: Stuyvesant Fish, 71, American railway entrepreneur and president of the Illinois Central Railroad

== April 11, 1923 (Wednesday) ==
- Eusebio Ayala resigned as President of Paraguay after less than 18 months in office. Eligio Ayala, no relation, was elected by the Paraguayan Congress to succeed him.
- U.S. Secretary of Commerce Herbert Hoover addressed the National League of Women Voters, advocating American participation in the World Court.
- Died: Thomas F. Smith, 57, New York City public administrator and former U.S. Congressman, was killed after being struck by a taxicab while crossing Fourteenth Street when he was leaving his office at Tammany Hall.

== April 12, 1923 (Thursday) ==
- The government of Japan announced that Crown Prince Hirohito would marry Princess Nagako Kuni in November. The press release came as Hirohito was preparing to begin a two week tour of Taiwan, at the time administered as the island of Formosa within the Japanese Empire.
- Lee de Forest successfully demonstrated his Phonofilm system to the New York Electrical Society.
- The Seán O'Casey play The Shadow of a Gunman premiered at the Abbey Theatre in Dublin, Ireland.

== April 13, 1923 (Friday) ==
- An 8.0 magnitude earthquake in Russia's Kamchatka Peninsula killed at least 36 people, and perhaps as many as 400, after triggering tsunamis up to 100 feet (30 m) high. The quake came two months after an 8.4 magnitude earthquake on February 3.
- Moscow was hit with flooding as the Moskva River overflowed.
- A crowd of workers took over the town hall of Mülheim in the Ruhr and established a workers' council.
- The outdoor play The Ramona Pageant premiered at Hemet, California.
- Born:
  - Hassan Ali Mansur, Prime Minister of Iran for 10 months from 1964 until his assassination in 1965
  - Supriyadi, Indonesian national hero, in East Java (disappeared 1945)
  - Don Adams (stage name for Donald J. Yarmy), American television actor known for Get Smart; in New York City (d. 2005)
  - Mari Blanchard, American film and TV actress; in Long Beach, California (d. of cancer, 1970)

== April 14, 1923 (Saturday) ==
- The Lansing–Ishii Agreement, signed on November 2, 1917 between the United States and Japan to mark their respective spheres of influence in China, was formally canceled by agreement of the two nations, represented by U.S. Secretary of State Charles Evans Hughes and Japan's Ambassador to the U.S., Masanao Hanihara.

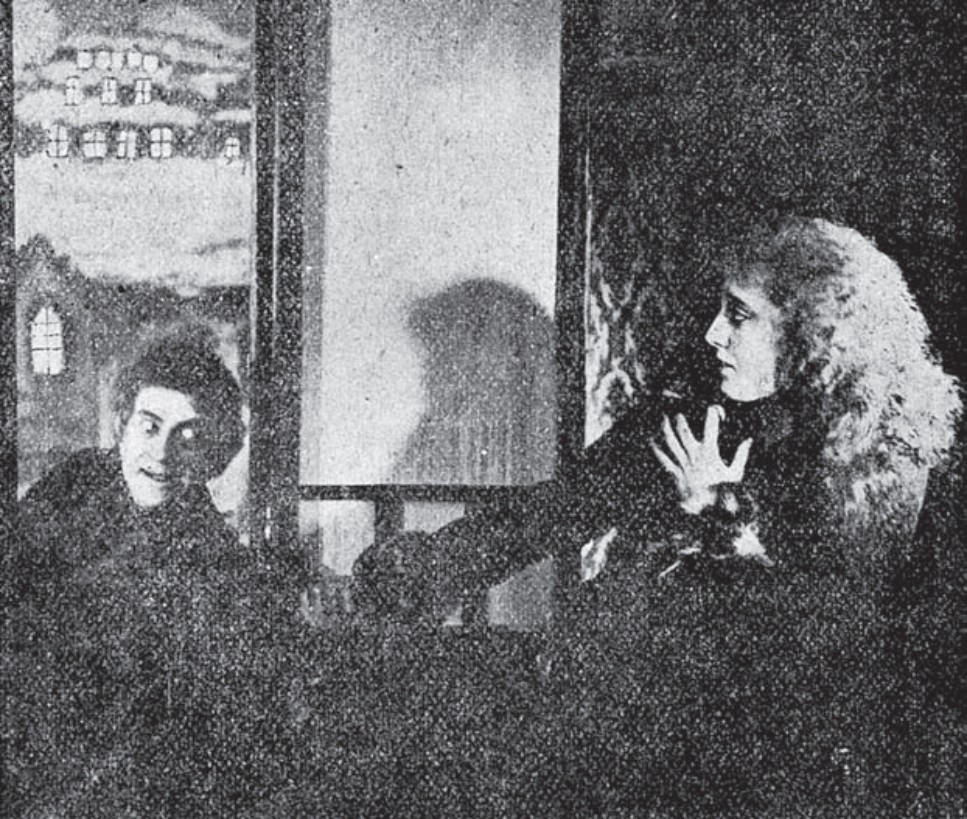
Paul Askonas, the first Dracula on film

- The first appearance of Count Dracula on film was seen as the Hungarian silent movie Drakula halála ("The Death of Dracula") premiered in Budapest, with actor Paul Askonas as the vampire.
- Amalgamated Bank, the largest financial institution owned by a labor union, began operations after having been chartered by the Amalgamated Clothing Workers of America on March 16, 1923.
- The National League of Women Voters voted against an endorsement of the League of Nations as presently constituted, but urged that the United States "associate itself with other nations" in order to prevent war.
- A dance marathon in Baltimore was stopped by police after 53 hours.
- Born: Roberto De Vicenzo, Argentine golfer and winner of the 1967 British Open; in Villa Ballester, Buenos Aires (d. 2017)

== April 15, 1923 (Sunday) ==
- Nihon Shōgakkō fire: 10 Japanese-American children were killed in a racially motivated arson attack on a Japanese Buddhist mission boarding school in Sacramento, California, by an itinerant Mexican-American serial arsonist.
- The "Phonofilm", Lee de Forest's revolutionary sound-on-film technique, was introduced to the public with three short movies at the Rivoli Theatre in New York City. While many of the spectators expected "that Mr. de Forest's invention showing a film synchronized with voices would also be the object of their attention", what was shown was people dancing to music. Although "the time of the music with the dancing was perfect", a reporter for The New York Times noted, "the music itself was not keenly interesting inasmuch as it sounded just about the same as that from the average phonograph record." The first picture was "The Gavotte", which "showed a man and woman dancing to old-time music", and "while one could hear the instruments being played for the dancers, one could not hear the slightest sound of a footfall." The second picture, "The Serenade" showed four musicians playing wind, percussion and string instruments, and the final one was "an Egyptian dancer, the tones from the phonofilm keeping perfect time with the graceful movements of the dancing girl on the screen." The Phonofilm demonstration was followed by the feature attraction for the moviegoers, Bella Donna, starring Pola Negri.
- The government of the Republic of Turkey issued the "Law of Abandoned Properties", authorizing the transfer to the government of any properties whose owners were not present, regardless of the reason, by a court-appointed person given power of attorney to sign on the absent owner's behalf.
- Insulin first became widely available for diabetes patients in North America.
- Several popular drama films of the year were released on the same day, with Enemies of Women, starring Lionel Barrymore and Alma Rubens; The West~Bound Limited with Ralph Lewis, Claire McDowell, Johnny Harron, and Ella Hall; and The Trail of the Lonesome Pine.
- Born: Anthony F. C. Wallace, Canadian-born American anthropologist who postulated the theory of the revitalization movement describing cultural change; in Toronto (d. 2015)

== April 16, 1923 (Monday) ==
- The Armenian State Committee of Cinema was founded by decree of the Soviet Union's State Committee for Cinematography, Goskino, to finance the filming and distribution of Armenian language films. Its studio, Armenfilm, would produce its first film, the documentary Soviet Armenia, the following year, followed by its first dramatic work, Namus.
- Eleven housing officials in Moscow were condemned to death for taking bribes.
- The government of British Prime Minister Stanley Baldwin presented its budget for the year. Revenues were higher than forecast so taxes on income and beer sales were cut.

== April 17, 1923 (Tuesday) ==
- Irish troops captured Dan Breen and a number of other Irish Republicans without resistance at the Glen of Aherlow.
- The record for the a dance marathon was broken for the fourth time in a week. On April 14, six couples in Baltimore went for 53 hours before being stopped by police. The next day, Magdalene Williams was the winner of a marathon in Houston after 65 hours and 30 minutes Two days later, Madeline Gottschick danced for 65 hours and 54 minutes in Cleveland, ending at 8:54 a.m. Meanwhile, an unusual traveling dance marathon, conducted in a truck that traveled through New York, New Jersey and Connecticut, moving each time that police arrived to enforce state law, ended with Vera Sheppard dancing for an even 69 hours. Records had been reported since March 6 with the first marathon in Sunderland in England.
- Voters in a referendum approved the incorporation of the new city of Riverdale, New Jersey.
- Born: Muhammad Atta-ullah Faizani, Afghan Islamic scholar and political activist; in Herat (disappeared 1979, presumed dead)
- Died: William John Murphy, 83, American real estate magnate known for creating the Phoenix suburb of Glendale, Arizona in 1891, initially as a haven for persons opposed to the sale of alcohol.

== April 18, 1923 (Wednesday) ==
- Yankee Stadium opened its doors in New York City. Babe Ruth hit the first home run in the ballpark's history as the New York Yankees downed the Boston Red Sox, 4 to 1. A crowd of 74,200 fans packed the stadium, setting a new single-game attendance record for a major league baseball game.
- Died: Savina Petrilli, 71, Italian founder of the Sisters of the Poor of Saint Catherine of Siena

== April 19, 1923 (Thursday) ==
- King Fouad I of Egypt promulgated the nation's first constitution, providing for a bicameral national parliament made up of a 214-member Chamber of Deputies and a Senate, along with a Prime Minister and cabinet of ministers who were accountable to the parliament and the King.
- Five people were killed and at least 40 wounded in fighting in the German city of Mülheim, where a mob had blockaded the Rathaus, Mulheim's city hall. By the time the siege was ended the next day, nine people were dead, 70 injured, and 40 rebels had been arrested.
- Clarence H. DeMar won his second consecutive Boston Marathon, and his third overall.

== April 20, 1923 (Friday) ==
- Frank Aiken became the new Chief of Staff of the Irish Republican Army to succeed Liam Lynch, who had been killed in an ambush 10 days earlier. Aiken, who had survived the attack by the Irish Free State National Army, urged the 12-member Executive Board to halt further action in the Irish Civil War, concluding that the anti-treaty IRA could not win a prolonged fight with the Free State. Aiken's resolution to make peace with the Irish Free State passed by a 9 to 2 vote.
- A bill in the House of Commons to prohibit the manufacture, importation or sale of liquor in the United Kingdom failed overwhelmingly, with only 14 votes in favor and 236 against. The proposal had been introduced by Edwin Scrymgeour, the only member of the Scottish Prohibition Party to win a seat in Parliament. Scrymgeour had defeated Winston Churchill in the 1922 election to capture the seat for Dundee.
- The first issue of the weekly pro-Nazi newspaper Der Stürmer ("The Stormer") was published by Julius Streicher.
- Born:
  - Mother Angelica, American Franciscan Catholic nun and founder of the Eternal Word Television Network in 1981; as Rita Rizzo in Canton, Ohio (d. 2016)
  - Agehananda Bharati, Austrian-born American Hindu monk and author; as Leopold Fischer in Vienna (d. 1991)
  - Tito Puente, Puerto Rican American salsa and Latin jazz musician known for "Oye Como Va"; in the Spanish Harlem section of New York City (d. 2000)
  - Irene Lieblich, Polish artist, illustrator and Holocaust survivor; in Zamość (d. 2008)
- Died:
  - Schuyler Wheeler, 63, American electrical engineer and inventor (in 1882) of the first practical electric fan.
  - Robert S. Munger, 78, American entrepreneur and philanthropist who co-invented the "Munger System Ginning Outfit", an improvement on the existing cotton gin, that allowed large scale operations in textile production

== April 21, 1923 (Saturday) ==
- Italy celebrated the Founding of Rome as a holiday for the first time as 50,000 Fascists in black shirts marched in military formation through the streets of Rome "winding their way through the streets past the Roman Forum, the Colisseum, the Baths of Caracalla and through the Triumphal Arch of Titus" to reach a large open field. According to tradition, the city of Rome had been founded in 753 BC and the 2,676th anniversary was made by decree to be the official labor day holiday. Benito Mussolini had May Day festivities replaced with this holiday instead, suppressing International Workers' Day.

== April 22, 1923 (Sunday) ==
- The Bulgarian Agrarian National Union, led by Prime Minister Aleksandar Stamboliyski, won 212 of the 245 seats in the elections for the unicameral National Assembly of Bulgaria, the Narodno Sabranie. The other 33 seats were split between the Constitutional Bloc and the Bulgarian Communist Party.
- The British Army began occupation of the city of Rawandiz, located in the British Mandate for Iraq but close to the borders of Iran and Turkey.
- Benito Mussolini slashed one billion lire from Italy's budget, reducing the projected deficit for the fiscal year 1923–24 to 3 billion. Most of the reductions of 25 percent were achieved by cutting civil service jobs.
- A bomb exploded at Comiskey Park in Chicago, home of baseball's Chicago White Sox, but there were no injuries. The Sox were in St. Louis to play a game against the St. Louis Browns. It was suspected that the hiring of non-union labor to paint the exterior of the ballpark was the reason for the bomb, but no arrests were ever made.
- Born:
  - Aaron Spelling, American film and television producer; in Dallas, Texas (d. 2006)
  - Geoffrey Hattersley-Smith, British geologist and glaciologist; in London (d. 2012)
  - Paula Fox, American writer of children's books; in New York City (d. 2017)
  - Bettie Page, American model; in Nashville, Tennessee (d. 2008)

== April 23, 1923 (Monday) ==
- Cannabis, the active ingredient in marijuana was added to the list of prohibited narcotics in Canada, without debate, when Canadian Minister of Health Henri Beland added "Cannabis indica (Indian hemp) or hasheesh" to the language of "An Act to Prohibit the Improper Use of Opium and other Drugs", along with heroin and codeine. Previously, the schedule of illegal narcotics had been limited to opium, morphine, cocaine and eucaine. The move received virtually no attention because little was known in Canada about the drug at the time. The legislation passed the House and was subsequently approved by the Senate of Canada.
- A group of merchants and social advocates in Korea organized Hyeongpyeongsa, with a mission to abolish the traditional caste system in the Asian nation and to end discrimination against people labeled as Baekjeong, the "untouchable" minority.
- The Port of Gdynia, constructed by Poland after the republic's labor problems with workers in the Free City of Danzig, was inaugurated in a ceremony. Initially, what had been the Prussian seaside resort of Gdingen, had a small harbor excavated to accommodate ships and a long pier.
- France blocked an Anglo-Swedish attempt to set up an inquiry into the administration of the Saar Basin after complaints were received from the population there of censorship. French delegate Gabriel Hanotaux said the measures were "temporary".
- At a meeting at the Istanbul suburb of Şehzadebaşı, the Turkish Football Federation (Türkiye Futbol Federasyonu), governing body for soccer football in Turkey, was founded as Futbol Hey'et-i Müttehidesi, with Yusuf Ziya Öniş of Galatasaray S.K. as its first president.
- The New Symphony Orchestra made its debut at Massey Hall in Toronto with 58 musicians conducted by Luigi von Kunits, after the original Toronto Symphony Orchestra had been disbanded in 1918. It revived the Toronto Symphony Orchestra name in 1927.
- Turkish Muslim actresses were featured in film for the first time, with the premiere of the silent film Ateşten Gömlek (The Ordeal) at the Palas Sinema in Istanbul's Beyoğlu district.
- Kodak unveiled their new film size called 16mm film.
- Born:
  - Walter Pitts, American theoretical neuroscientist; in Detroit (d. 1969)
  - Dolph Briscoe, Governor of Texas, 1973 to 1979; in Uvalde, Texas (d. 2010)
  - Joan Gadsdon, Australian ballet dancer; in Lithgow, New South Wales (d. 2003)
- Died:
  - Eugen Huber, 73, Swiss law professor who drafted the Swiss Civil Code of 1907
  - Princess Louise of Prussia, 84, daughter of Kaiser Wilhelm I, later the Grand Duchess of Baden from 1858 to 1907

== April 24, 1923 (Tuesday) ==
- Thirty-one of the 237 people on the Portuguese steamer Mossamedes died when the ship capsized off the shore of Cabo Frio in South-West Africa (now Namibia). Seven drowned before they could evacuate the ship, and another 24 died when their lifeboat overturned. The 206 survivors were picked up by the French gunboat Cassiopee, the Portuguese gunboat Salvador Correia and by fishing vessels from Porto Alexandre in Angola.
- The Fascist Grand Council approved Benito Mussolini's motion to embody all the Fascists into a national militia, giving the country a reserve army of 500,000 members, without additional expenditures as they were considered volunteers.
- The city of Beverly Hills, California voted 507 to 337 to remain independent and not be annexed to Los Angeles.
- Born:
  - Gus Bodnar, Canadian ice hockey player who won the National Hockey League's Calder Memorial Trophy as rookie of the year for the 1943-44 season; in Fort William, Ontario (d. 2005)
  - Georgy Morozov, Soviet-Russian World War II hero; in Upryamovo (d. 1971)
  - Freddy Bienstock, Swiss-born American music publishing executive who solicited material for use by Elvis Presley (d. 2009)

== April 25, 1923 (Wednesday) ==
- The San Pedro Maritime Strike, the largest challenge to the "open shop" system in Los Angeles where employers were not required to limit their employment to labor union members, began as the Industrial Workers of the World (IWW) Local No. 510 blocked the loading and unloading of ships in the harbor.
- The new Warner Bros. studio released its first film, Main Street, based on a novel by Sinclair Lewis, directed by Harry Beaumont and starring Florence Vidor and Monte Blue. No copies of the film exist, the negative having been discarded by the studio on December 27, 1948.
- Turkey demanded that the Soviet Union be allowed to participate in the reopened Conference of Lausanne.
- Born: Albert King (stage name for Albert Nelson), U.S. blues guitarist and singer; in Indianola, Mississippi (d. 1992)

== April 26, 1923 (Thursday) ==
- The wedding of Prince Albert, Duke of York, and Lady Elizabeth Bowes-Lyon, who would become King George VI and the Queen Consort in 1936, took place at Westminster Abbey. The union would produce the future Queen Elizabeth II in 1926, and in 1936, upon the unexpected abdication of Edward VIII, Prince Albert and Lady Elizabeth would become King George VI and Queen Elizabeth.
- Northeastern University (NEU) was founded in Shenyang in Liaoning province in accordance with an order by warlord and provincial ruler Zhang Zuolin.
- An international coalition of women's suffragists, including the American Carrie Chapman Catt, threatened to picket the home of Benito Mussolini if he did not participate in a women's suffrage congress in Rome next month.

== April 27, 1923 (Friday) ==
- Éamon de Valera announced that the Irish Republican Army was prepared to agree to a ceasefire in the civil war.
- The political party Cumann na nGaedheal (Gaelic language for "Society of the Gaels) was founded in the Irish Free State, four months before the scheduled August 27 elections for the Dáil, by Prime Minister W. T. Cosgrave and other politicians from the Sinn Féin party who had voted in favor of the Anglo-Irish Treaty.

== April 28, 1923 (Saturday) ==
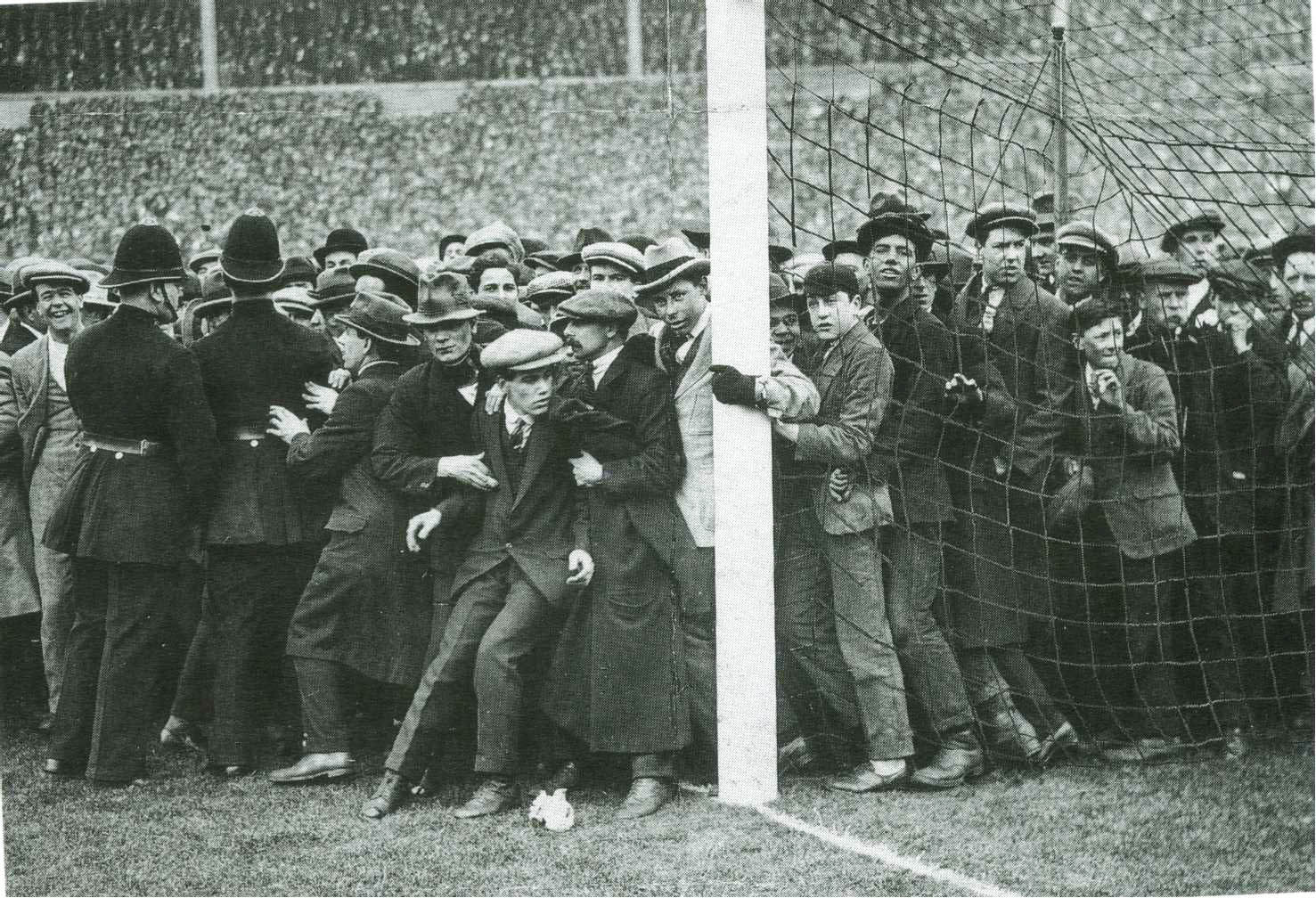
The crowd surging onto the field at Wembley

- Wembley Stadium hosted its first event, the FA Cup Final. Bolton Wanderers beat West Ham United, 2 to 0, in front of 126,047 paying customers, though estimates place the actual number at around 200,000 as approximately 75,000 fans scaled the venue's inadequate barriers and gained free admission. Reportedly, more than 1,000 people were injured as the crowd spilled over onto the playing area. The game was almost canceled, but officials feared that doing so would cause a riot and so a police contingent led by PC George Scorey slowly coaxed the crowd off the pitch before the match could start.
- The German ocean liner SS Deutschland was launched.
- Leeds defeated Hull F.C. 28-3 to win the Challenge Cup of rugby at Belle Vue, Wakefield.
- Born: Bill Hutchison, Australian rules football star and one of the first enshrined legends in the Hall of Fame; in Kensington, Victoria (d. 1982)
- Died:
  - Knute Nelson, 80, U.S. Senator from Minnesota since 1895, and previously a U.S. Congressman and the state's Governor, died as he was taking a train back to his home in Alexandria, Minnesota, shortly after departing from Baltimore.
  - Daniel J. Riordan, 52, U.S. Representative for New York since 1906

== April 29, 1923 (Sunday) ==
- In India, Gita Press, the world's largest publisher of Hindu religious texts, was incorporated in Gorakhpur, now located in the state of Uttar Pradesh.
- Two splinter groups of the French Communist Party merged to form the Socialist-Communist Union.
- Seven people died in the sinking of the American steamship Seaconnet one mile south of Vineyard Sound in Massachusetts.
- Born:
  - Irvin Kershner, American film director known for The Empire Strikes Back and Never Say Never Again; in Philadelphia (d. 2010)
  - Maxine Audley, English stage and film actress; in London (d. 1992)
  - Eva Monley, German-born Kenyan film scout and expert on filming in Africa; in Berlin (d. 2011)
  - Roberto Conti, Italian mathematician; in Florence (d. 2006)
- Died: Julia Green Scott, 84, American philanthropist

== April 30, 1923 (Monday) ==
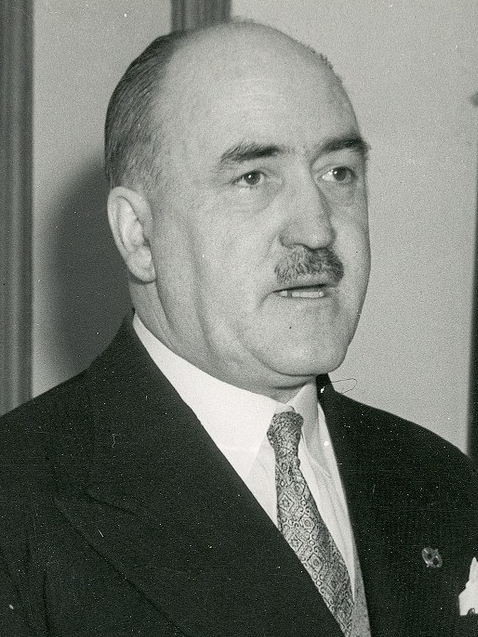
Frank Aiken in 1944

- The Irish Republican Army's new Chief of Staff, Frank Aiken, announced a ceasefire and called on all IRA volunteers to relinquish their weapons on May 24. The ceasefire was endorsed by Irish Republican leader Éamon de Valera, bringing a halt to the Irish Civil War at 12:00 noon.
- By a 7–2 decision in Cunard Steamship Co., Ltd. v. Mellon, the U.S. Supreme Court declared that American ships could sell and serve liquor on the "high seas" more than three miles beyond U.S. territory, but upheld a ban on foreign vessels from bringing liquor into American ports.
- Born:
  - Al Lewis (stage name for Abraham Meister), American comedian and television actor known for The Munsters and Car 54, Where Are You?; in New York City (d. 2006)
  - Percy Heath, American jazz bassist for the Modern Jazz Quartet; in Wilmington, North Carolina (d. 2005)
  - Francis Tucker, South African rally car driver, 1966 national champion; in Johannesburg (d. 2008)
- Died: Emerson Hough, 65, popular American novelist of Westerns
