= March 1923 =

Month of 1923

<<	March 1923					>>
Su	Mo	Tu	We	Th	Fr	Sa
				1	2	3
4	5	6	7	8	9	10
11	12	13	14	15	16	17
18	19	20	21	22	23	24
25	26	27	28	29	30	31

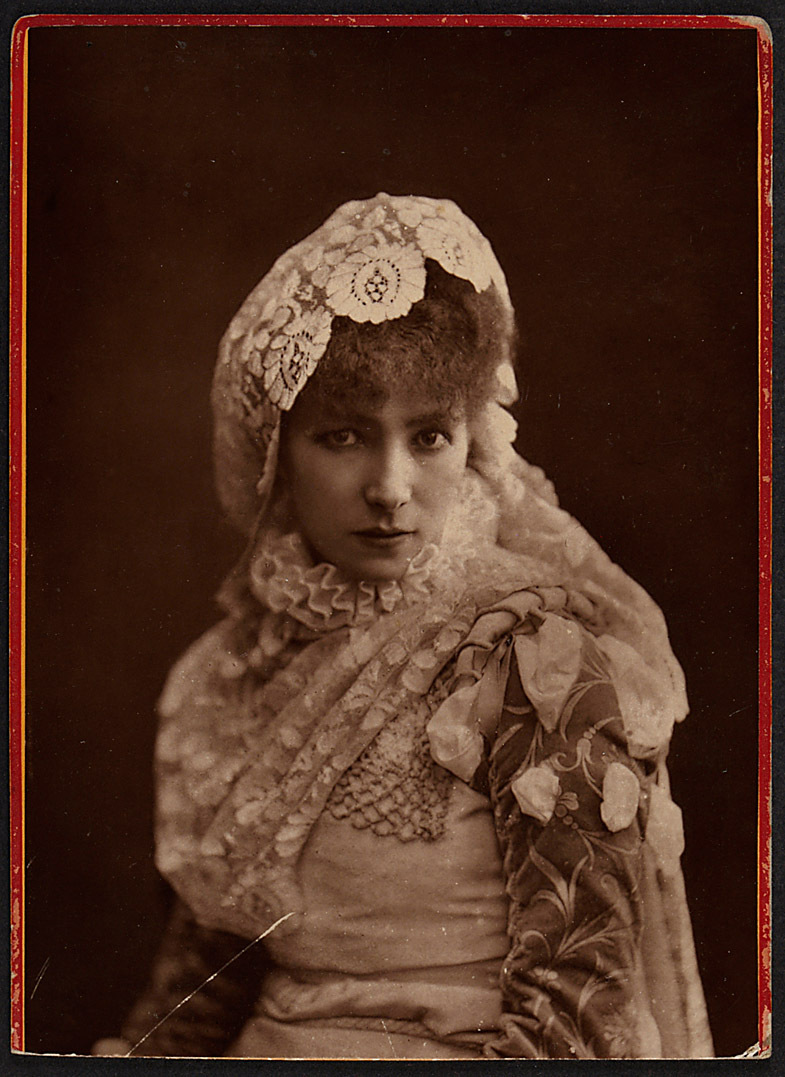
March 26, 1923: Beloved stage and film actress Sarah Bernhardt dies after 60-year career

The following events occurred in March 1923:

== March 1, 1923 (Thursday) ==
- The Kingdom of Greece became one of the last remaining world nations to switch from the Julian calendar to the Gregorian calendar, which was 13 days ahead of what had been used before. What would have been Thursday, February 16, 1923, on the Julian calendar became March the first.
- José Serrato was inaugurated as the President of Uruguay after winning the first popular election in the South American nation's history, held on November 26.
- France and Belgium decreed that they would impose the death penalty on anyone in occupied Germany sabotaging transport lines.
- Judgment was delivered in the Stopes v Sutherland libel trial in the High Court, London. The defendant, Dr Halliday Sutherland, successfully defeated the libel action brought by Marie Stopes.
- Pola Negri released a written statement saying she was breaking off her engagement to Charlie Chaplin. "I consider I am too poor to marry Charlie Chaplin", the statement read. "He needs to marry a wealthy woman, and he should have no difficulty in finding one in the United States – the richest and most beautiful country in the world." She rescinded the statement the next day, announcing that "We have made up. I believe that it is what you call it here in America", she stated.
- Died: William Bourke Cockran, 69, Irish-born U.S. Congressman for New York who served more than 10 years between 1887 and the time of his death, died the day after being honored on his birthday after a speech in Congress. Cockran, who had been re-elected only four months earlier, died at his Washington home three days before he was to be sworn in for a new term in the 68th U.S. Congress. Cockran suffered a stroke two hours after blowing out candles on his birthday cake and telling the distinguished guests, "I may tell you my wish. It is that I may live many years with my dear wife."

== March 2, 1923 (Friday) ==
- Otto Blehr submitted his resignation as Prime Minister of Norway along with his entire cabinet, after the Parliament refused to ratify Norway's treaty with Portugal.
- French Army troops occupying Germany's Ruhr valley seized 232 locomotives and hundreds of freight train cars (and their cargoes) in early morning raids in the towns of cities of Düsseldorf, Hamborn, and Wanne, as collection for past due reparations.

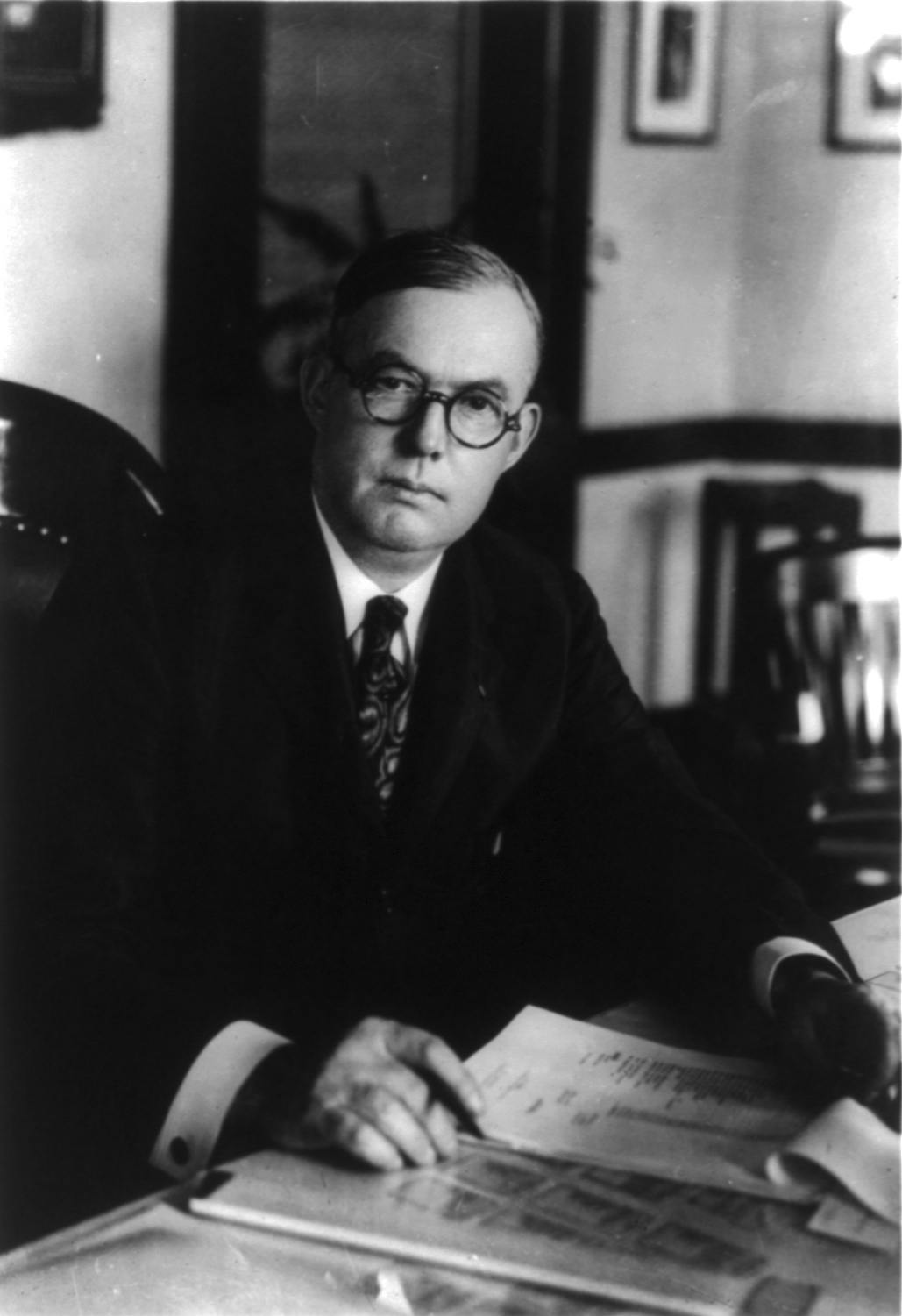
C. R. Forbes

- The U.S. Senate began an investigation into the possibly criminal activities of Charles R. Forbes, who had resigned two days earlier as Directors of the U.S. Veterans Bureau.
- Born:
  - Hito Çako, Albanian Communist politician, lieutenant general and honoree as "Hero of the People"; in Progonat, Principality of Albania (present-day Albania) (d. 1975)
  - Shaikh Ayaz, Pakistani Sindhi language poet, book author and playwright; as Mubarak Ali Shaikh, in Shikarpur, Bombay Province, British India (present-day Pakistan) (d. 1997)
  - Harriet Frank Jr., American screenwriter, known for her screenplay collaborations with her husband Irving Ravetch for director Martin Ritt for The Long, Hot Summer, Hud and Norma Rae; as Harriet Goldstein, in Portland, Oregon (d. 2020)
  - Nelly Wicky, one of the first 12 women to serve in the Parliament of Switzerland after women were allowed in 1971 to vote in national elections and serve in federal office; as Nelly Rosset, in Le Petit-Saconnex, Canton of Geneva, Switzerland (d. 2020)

== March 3, 1923 (Saturday) ==
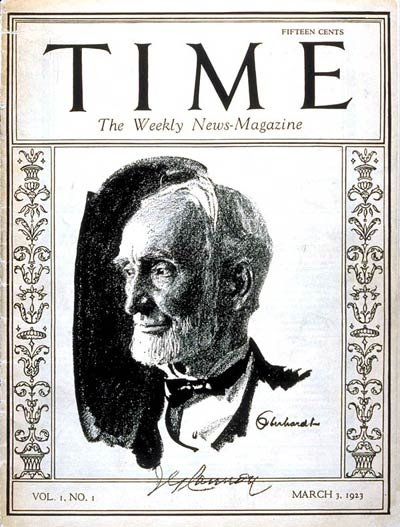
The first issue of TIME Magazine

- The first issue of Time magazine, weekly summary of news founded by Briton Hadden and Henry R. Luce, was on newsstands. In that the cover dates of weekly magazines are for at least a week ahead (usually for the release date of the next scheduled issue) to avoid the appearance of being out-of-date, the March 3, 1923 issue was actually put on newsstands on February 24. Joseph G. Cannon, the former Speaker of the U.S. House of Representatives and who was retiring from Congress after 50 years, was featured on the first cover.
- On the last full day of the 67th U.S. Congress, the U.S. Senate rejected President Warren G. Harding's proposal to have the U.S. join the World Court, with only 24 senators in favor and 49 against. Only one member of Harding's Republican Party, Senator Peter Norbeck of South Dakota, voted for the bill.
- The French Army extended its seizure of railway yards in the Ruhr occupational zone, taking control of the major industrial center at Darmstadt, along with the ports of Mannheim and Karlsruhe, and the villages of Lorch am Rhein and Knielingen, now a part of Karlsruhe.
- Twenty-two people were fatally poisoned at a dinner for students, teachers and family members at the First Provincial Normal School in Hangzhou in China's Zhejiang province, and 250 others required medical treatment. Five cooks were arrested after the deaths were traced to lethal toxins in rice.
- Born:
  - Doc Watson, folk musician; as Arthel Lane Watson, in Deep Gap, North Carolina (d. 2012)
  - Meghrajji III, Indian maharaja of the Dhrangadhra State, from 1942 until the independence of India in 1947, and later a politician; in Dhrangadhra, Kathiawar Agency, Bombay Presidency, British India (now in Gujarat state, India) (d. 2010)

== March 4, 1923 (Sunday) ==
- A lengthy article titled "Better Fewer, But Better" by Vladimir Lenin was published in Pravda. In it, he wrote that global revolution was inevitable because Eastern countries like Russia, India and China accounted for the overwhelming majority of the world's population, but the victory of socialism may have to wait until they were sufficiently educated and developed.
- The 68th United States Congress began its new session with 435 representatives but only 95 of its 96 Senate seats were filled. The Senate, considering a challenge to Earle B. Mayfield by George Peddy regarding the 1922 election, declined to swear Mayfield in. Mayfield would be sworn in nine months later on December 3, pending a final investigation of Peddy's challenge.
- President Harding signed the Agricultural Credits Act, providing for the establishment of regional banks to provide loans to farm cooperative associations from which farmers could borrow.
- Elections were held for the 60-seat parliament in the Republic of San Marino. Later the country was taken over by the Fascist Party. All the seats were won by the "Patriotic Bloc", a set of right-wing political parties dominated by the Sammarinese Fascist Party, which would serve as San Marino's sole political party from 1926 until 1943.
- In Saltillo in Mexico's Coahuila state, the Universidad Autónoma Agraria Antonio Narro (UAAAN), a public university and school of agriculture, was founded at the Buenavista Estate bequeathed to the public by the late philanthropist Antonio Narro Rodríguez.
- IK Göta defeated Djurgårdens IF, 3 to 0, to win the Swedish Ice Hockey Championship.
- In Ireland's national championship for hurling, Limerick's Shannonsiders defeated Dublin's Boys in Blue, 8 goals and 5 points to Dublin's 3 goals and 2 points, equivalent to a 29 to 11 victory, based on goals being worth 3-points each.
- The Anti-Flirt Club, whose purpose was to protect young women and girls from unwelcome attention from men, launched "Anti-Flirt Week".
- Born:
  - Patrick Moore, English astronomer; as Patrick Caldwell-Moore, in Pinner, Middlesex (d. 2012)
  - Piero D'Inzeo, Italian Olympic show jumping rider and 1959 world champion; in Rome (d. 2014)

== March 5, 1923 (Monday) ==
- Soviet Foreign Affairs Minister Georgy Chicherin delivered a note of protest to Finnish ambassador Antti Hackzell protesting Finland's negotiations with the League of Nations over the Karelia region, which the Soviets saw as theirs.
- The Sikorsky Aero Engineering Corporation, which would become one of the world's largest manufacturers of helicopters, was incorporated in the U.S. by Russian-born aircraft designer Igor Sikorsky.

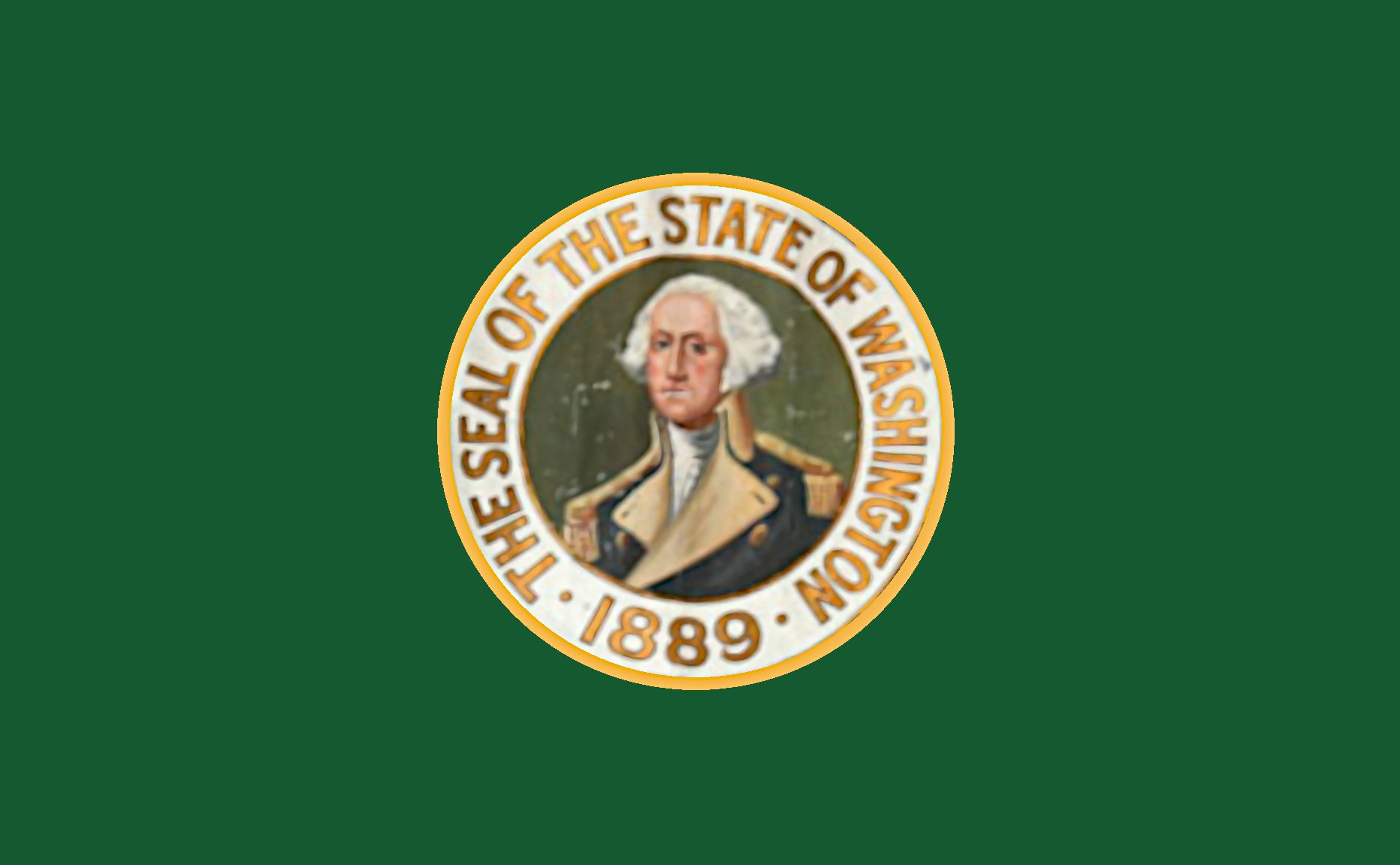
The first official state flag

- The U.S. state of Washington adopted an official flag for the first time, more than 33 years after becoming the 42nd U.S. state in 1889. The banner consisted of the state seal being displayed against a dark green background. Prior to 1923, a blue flag with a gold profile of U.S. President Washington had been displayed unofficially.
- Harry F. Young, a former steeplejack who had used his skills from working high on buildings as a construction worker before making more money as one of several building climbers who billed themselves as "The Human Fly", fell to his death from New York's Martinique Hotel, when he slipped while doing stunt work to draw attention to Harold Lloyds new comedy, Safety Last!. Young reached the ledge of the 10th floor of the 12-story hotel but his foot slipped. "For an incredible moment," The New York Times reported, "Young seemed to stand in space, then his white form came crashing down onto a coping and went in a quick plunge to the sidewalk."
- Born:
  - Laurence Tisch, American businessman and CEO of the CBS television network; in Brooklyn, New York City (d. 2003)
  - Robert Irsay, American professional football team owner of the NFL's Baltimore Colts and moved the team to Indianapolis in 1984 where it became the Indianapolis Colts; in Chicago (d. 1997)
  - Loren Singer, American novelist, author the bestselling book The Parallax View; in Buffalo, New York (d. 2009)

== March 6, 1923 (Tuesday) ==
- The Egyptian Feminist Union (Arabic: الاتحاد النسائي المصري), the first nationwide feminist movement in Egypt, was founded at the home of activist Huda Sha'arawi.
- The Halibut Treaty was signed between the United States and Canada. It was the first time Canada had ever signed a treaty with a foreign nation without involving a representative from Britain.
- Radio station 5SC, owned by the British Broadcasting Company, began broadcasting from Glasgow and would become the first station in BBC Scotland, soon to expand to Aberdeen, Dundee and Edinburgh.
- German Chancellor Wilhelm Cuno told the Reichstag that Germany would not enter direct negotiations with France over the reparations issue, but would do so through a third party.
- The government of British Prime Minister Bonar Law was pressured by the opposition to take a more definite stand on the issue of France's policy toward the Ruhr region.
- Five soldiers of the Irish Free State Army were killed by a "booby trap" bomb while searching a suspected Irish Republican Army (IRA) at Baranarigh Wood near the village of Knocknagoshel in County Kerry. A gruesome reprisal was carried out the next day against nine IRA prisoners.
- Born:
  - Ed McMahon, American television personality known for being the sidekick of Johnny Carson on The Tonight Show and for starring in his own program, Star Search; in Detroit (d. 2009)
  - Wes Montgomery, African American jazz guitarist; as John Leslie Montgomery, in Indianapolis (d. 1968)
- Died: Joseph McDermott, 44, American film actor (b. 1878)

== March 7, 1923 (Wednesday) ==
- The execution by explosion of eight inmates was carried out by Irish Free State authorities at the village of Ballyseedy in County Kerry after a group of nine was taken to a crossroads and tied together around a land mine, which was then detonated. One prisoner, Stephen Fuller (who would later become a member of the Irish parliament), was blown free and escaped to treatment for his injuries. The other prisoners who survived the explosion were shot to death by the Irish Army.
- Adolf Hitler told the Chicago Tribune that he would support automobile magnate Henry Ford (who was known for his anti-Semitism) if Ford ran for President of the United States, though he denied that the Nazi Party had received any financial backing from Ford.The Nazis had established a large organization in Munich sending out reproductions of antisemitic writings first published in the Ford-owned newspaper The Dearborn Independent.
- Neville Chamberlain was appointed Britain's Minister of Health.
- VIAG, as predecessor of E.ON, an electric utility brand in Europe, founded in Munich, Germany.
- Born: Mahlon Clark, musician; in Portsmouth, Virginia (d. 2007)

== March 8, 1923 (Thursday) ==
- Aviation pioneer Lawrence Sperry, who had invented the autopilot and the artificial horizon for airplanes and founded the Sperry Aircraft Company, demonstrated to skeptics that refueling an airplane in flight would someday be possible. Sperry piloting a small Sperry Messenger, was able to fly in close enough proximity to a de Havilland airplane flown by Lieutenant Clyde Finter that the two planes touched eight times during the demonstration above the Mineola Airfield at Long Island. Both airplanes were flying at 65 miles per hour (105 km/h) as the contact was demonstrated.
- King George V and Queen Consort Elizabeth broke British tradition by having dinner at the home of one of their subjects, rather than hosting their guests. Waldorf Astor, 2nd Viscount Astor of the House of Lords and his wife, U.S. native Nancy Astor of the House of Commons hosted their majesties in a meeting with various labour union executives in an affair that "was unique in British social history."
- The short comedy film The Love Nest starring Buster Keaton was released. It was the final short film of Keaton's silent-era career as he would concentrate on feature-length movies over the next decade.
- Born: Louk Hulsman, Dutch forensic scientist and criminologist; as Lodewijk Hulsman, in Kerkrade (d. 2009)
- Died: Johannes Diderik van der Waals, 85, Dutch physicist and Nobel Prize laureate (b. 1837)

== March 9, 1923 (Friday) ==
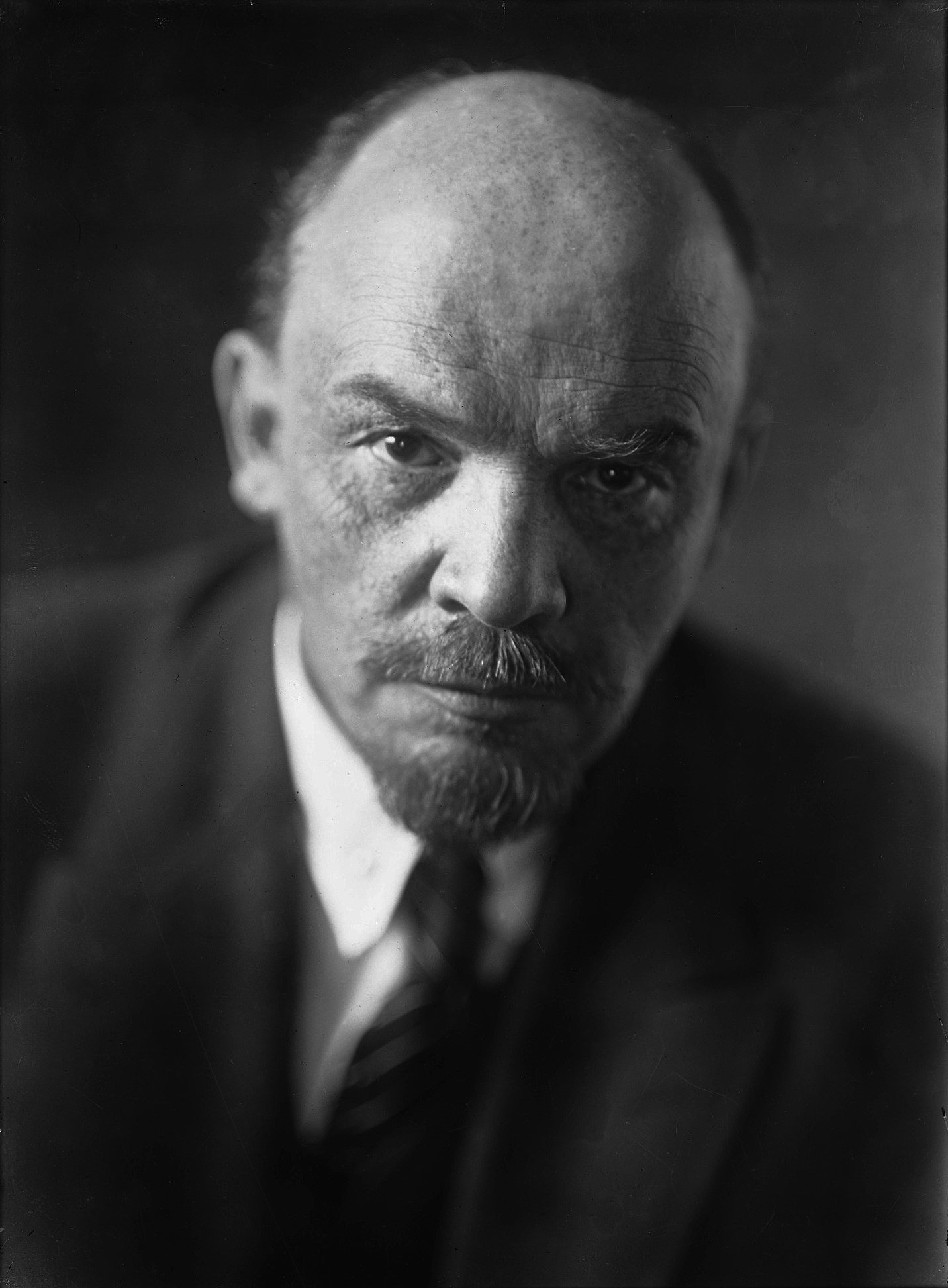
Lenin

- Vladimir Lenin, General Secretary of the Soviet Communist Party and the de facto leader of the Soviet Union, suffered his third stroke in less than a year. Lenin had returned to work on October 3 with limited duties as permitted by his four physicians. The Communist Party newspaper Pravda informed the Russian public of the news on March 12, announcing "Lenin's health has markedly worsened. Symptoms of blood vessel rupture again appeared, causing certain interference with the power of movement of the right arm and leg."
- A detective with the bomb squad of the New York City Police Department (NYPD) revealed that the squad's detectives had discovered that 30 NYPD uniformed policemen were members of the Ku Klux Klan.
- The first bill ever introduced by a woman in the British House of Commons was carried, 338 to 56. It was Lady Astor's bill forbidding the sale of alcohol for consumption on the premises to persons under 18 years of age. The previous law allowed sales of beer to 14-year-olds and spirits to those of 16.
- The largest meatpacking company in the United States, with half a billion dollars in assets, was created by the merger of Armour and Company with Morris & Company.
- A man from New York became the first person to jump from the Washington Monument to commit suicide. Albert B. Seip went to the observation room near the top of the monument, exited a window, and plunged 504 feet (154 m) to his death.
- Born:
  - James L. Buckley, U.S. Senator and judge; in New York City (d. 2023)
  - Walter Kohn, Austrian physicist and recipient of the Nobel Prize in Chemistry; in Vienna (d. 2016)

== March 10, 1923 (Saturday) ==
- The capsizing of a Greek Navy transport, the Alexandros, killed about 150 Greek officers and soldiers of the battleships, Kilkis, Lemnos and Savaroff who were sailing between Salamis and Piraeus.
- At Fairfax, Oklahoma, a nitroglycerine bomb killed three people in the destruction of the home of Bill Smith and Rita Smith in the continuing murder of wealthy Osage Indians on the Osage Indian Reservation.
- Two French officials (an army officer and a railway chief) were found murdered near occupied Buer, Germany.
- The Villarreal football club was founded in Spain.
- Born: Val Logsdon Fitch, nuclear physicist and Nobel Prize laureate; in Merriman, Nebraska (d. 2015)
- Died: Salvador Seguí, 35, Spanish Catalonian labor union organizer, was assassinated by agents of a manufacturers association (b. 1887)

== March 11, 1923 (Sunday) ==
- Over 100 members and suspected members of the Irish Self-Determination League, a group of British residents "of Irish birth or descent," were arrested at dawn in London, Glasgow and Liverpool at the request of the government of the Irish Free State, to be placed on Royal Navy ships to be deported to Dublin. English and Scottish prosecutors relied on the authority of the Restoration of Order in Ireland Act 1920, prompting English barrister Patrick Hastings to file a lawsuit for false imprisonment against the British government on behalf of Art O'Brien one of the arrest subjects who had not yet been deported. The result was that the Court of Appeal and the House of Lords would declare in R v Secretary of State for Home Affairs, ex parte O'Brien that the Restoration of Order Act was illegal.
- An F5 tornado swept through Madison County, Tennessee, destroying more than 50 homes killing 20 people and injuring 70 others in and around the western Tennessee town of Pinson.
- Sweden won the Ice Hockey European Championship, finishing with a perfect 4–0 record.
- Died: Karl von Müller, 49, German naval captain (b. 1873)

== March 12, 1923 (Monday) ==
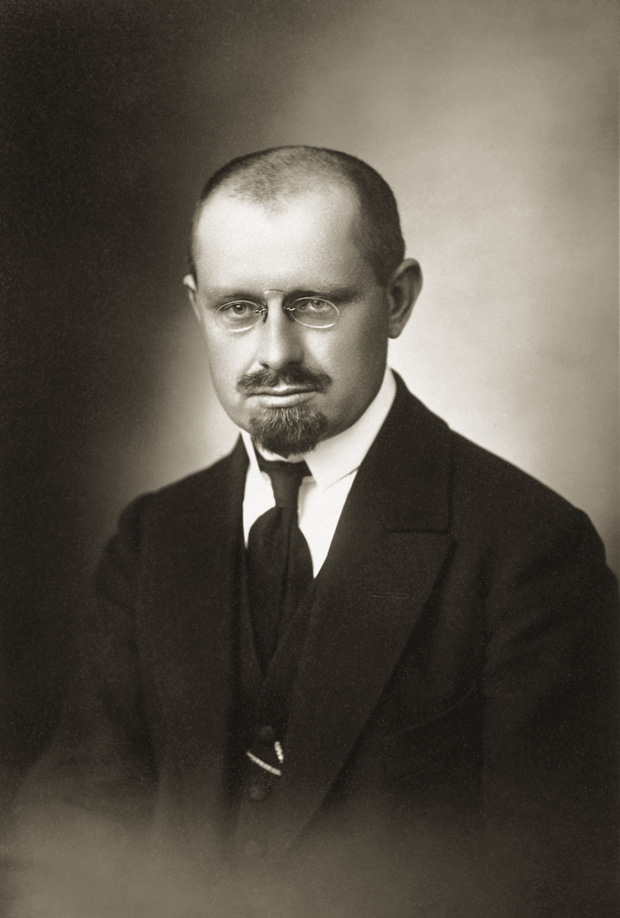
Stulginskis

- Lithuania's President Aleksandras Stulginskis dissolved the Baltic nation's first democratically elected parliament, the 78-member Seimas, after Prime Minister Ernestas Galvanauskas was unable to get approval for a cabinet of ministers. President Stulginskis ordered new elections to be held on May 12.

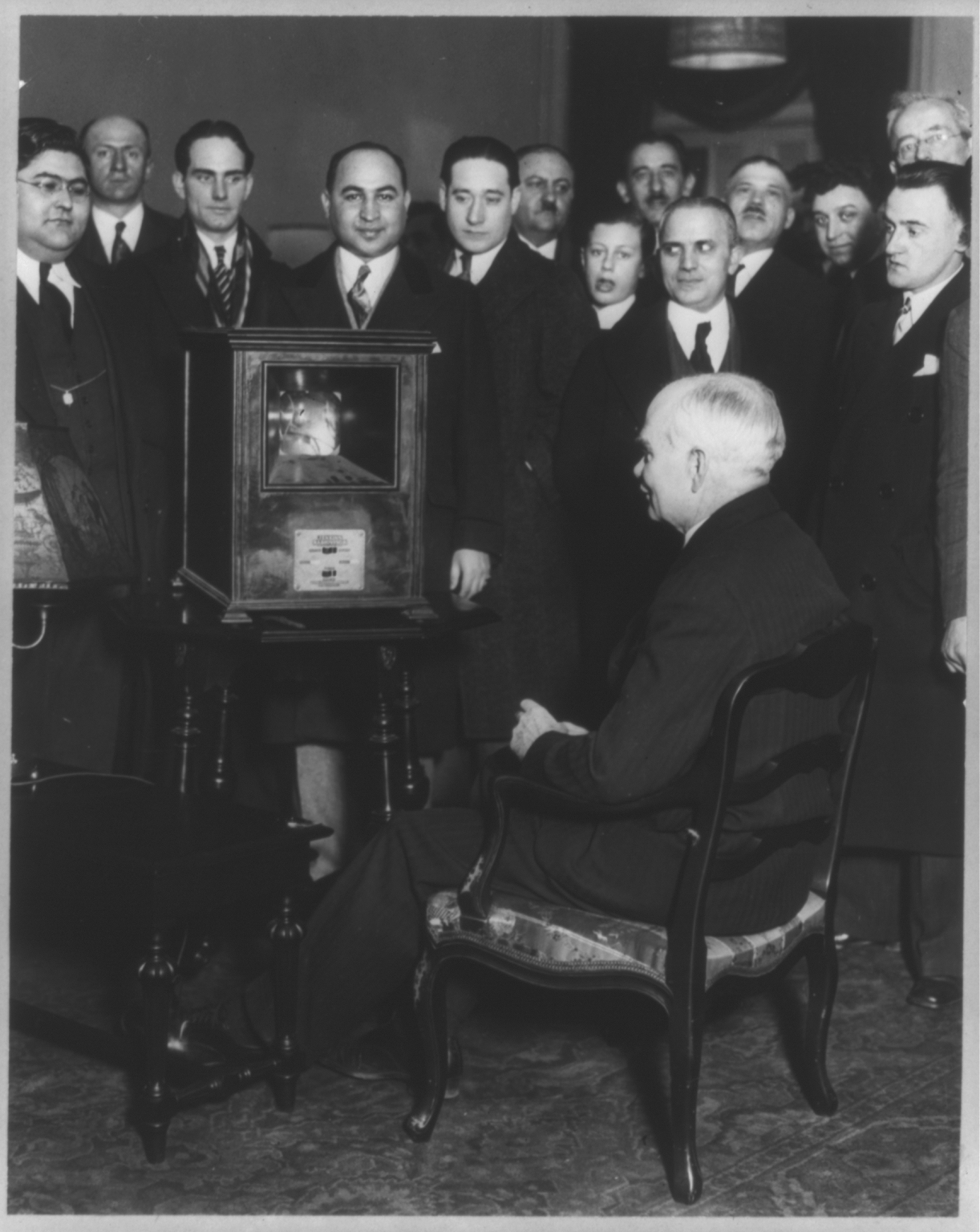
De Forest watching and listening to a Phonofilm

- American electronics engineer Lee de Forest held a press conference to demonstrate his new system of "talking movies", Phonofilm. The process recorded sound directly on to film so that what was seen and what was heard was simultaneously reproduced. De Forest announced that he would soon be releasing short Phonofilms to be played at New York's Rivoli Theater.
- Seven German civilians were killed and 13 wounded in Düsseldorf by French troops in the occupied Ruhr region following the March 10 murder of two French officials.

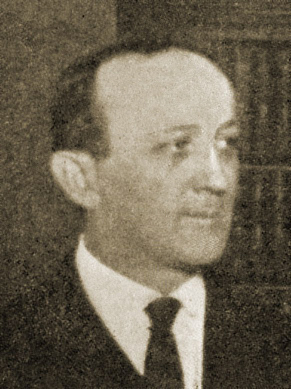
Foster

- The trial of William Z. Foster and 31 other U.S. Communists began in St. Joseph, Michigan with jury selection. Foster, an official of the Communist Party of America, was accused of violating a Michigan state law against being a member of a criminal syndicate.
- Born:
  - Wally Schirra, American astronaut, first person to travel three times into outer space on Mercury 8 in 1962, Gemini 6A in 1965, and Apollo 7 in 1968; as Walter Marty Schirra Jr., in La Jolla, California (d. 2007)
  - Hjalmar Andersen, Norwegian Olympic speed skater who won three gold medals at the 1952 Winter Olympics; in Rødøy Municipality(d. 2013)
  - Mae Young, American female professional wrestler; as Johnnie Mae Young, in Sand Springs, Oklahoma (d. 2014)

== March 13, 1923 (Tuesday) ==
- French Minister of War André Maginot announced that another 15,000 troops would be sent into the Ruhr and Rhineland.
- The Soviet Union first publicized the recent stroke suffered by Vladimir Lenin but described his condition as "satisfactory."
- A $50,000 paternity suit was brought against Babe Ruth by a 19-year-old Manhattan woman.

== March 14, 1923 (Wednesday) ==
- The Conference of Ambassadors of the League of Nations, deciding on a settlement of the disputes remaining from the Polish–Ukrainian War, awarded the disputed Eastern Galicia territory to Poland, including Lwów, Stanyslaviv and Tarnopol. The area would be captured by the Soviet Union in World War II and is now part of Ukraine.
- Rudolph Valentino and Natacha Rambova were legally remarried in Crown Point, Indiana.
- Pete Parker called the play-by-play of the first ice hockey game ever broadcast on the radio in its entirety, between the Regina Capitals and the Edmonton Eskimos of the Western Canada Hockey League.
- Born: Diane Arbus, American photographer; as Diane Nemerov, in New York City (d. 1971)
- Died: Charlie Daly, 25, Irish Republican, was executed by firing squad in Northern Ireland at Drumboe Castle at Stranorlar, County Donegal along with fellow anti-Treaty guerrillas Sean Larkin, Daniel Enwright and Timothy O' Sullivan (b. 1896)

== March 15, 1923 (Thursday) ==
- Germany offered 20 billion gold marks to France and Belgium to end the occupation of the Ruhr.
- Yahya Ibrahim Pasha formed a new government as Prime Minister of Egypt, succeeding Mohamed Tawfik Naseem.

== March 16, 1923 (Friday) ==
- In Paris, the governors of the International Lawn Tennis Federation (ILTF) voted to end the practice of recognizing the three world championship tennis tournaments (for grass courts, clay courts and indoor competition) and to coordinate four national championships that became the "Grand Slam"— the Australian Open, the French Open, Wimbledon (in the UK) and the U.S. Open. "Thus," an Associated Press report said, "the selection of world champions will be left to the press experts or popular opinion, and as such they will be unofficial." The following day, the United States Lawn Tennis Association board voted to join the ILTF.
- An Irish Republican Army manifesto threatened to bomb the La Scala Opera House in Dublin if the St. Patrick's Day boxing championship bout between Mike McTigue and Battling Siki went forward.
- The Western film The Covered Wagon, the most popular film during 1923, premiered at the Criterion Theatre in New York City. It starred J. Warren Kerrigan and Lois Wilson.
- Born: Joyce Carlson, American animator for Walt Disney Productions; in Racine, Wisconsin (d. 2008)

== March 17, 1923 (Saturday) ==
- Irish boxer Mike McTigue dethroned the reigning world champion, Senegalese fighter Louis Mbarick Fall (who fought as "Battling Siki") to win boxing's World Light Heavyweight Championship by decision after a 20-round bout at La Scala Opera House in Dublin, Ireland. The police presence was heavy due to the bomb threat, and one exploded near the venue as the boxers were entering the ring. Two children were injured and nearby windows were blown out by the blast.
- The first airline of Soviet Russia, Dobrolet, a predecessor of Aeroflot, was formed by the government's amalgamation of several private air carriers with an initial investment of 500,000 gold rubles by the government. It would inaugurate its first flight on July 15, 1923, between Moscow and Nizhny Novgorod.
- Police in Moscow arrested Soviet Russian serial killer Vasili Komaroff. The well-regarded horse trader confessed to murdering 33 people over the previous two years, in all cases men whom he had met at a market and then lured to his home on the pretext of inspecting a horse that Komaroff had for sale. Komaroff would be executed on June 18.

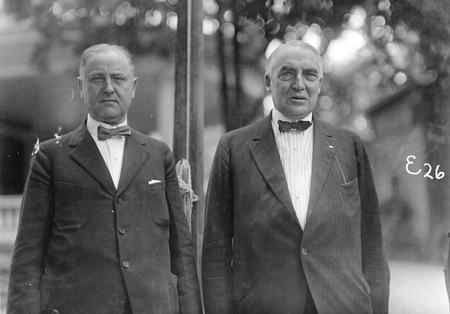
Daugherty and Harding

- U.S. Attorney General Harry M. Daugherty announced that President Warren G. Harding would run for re-election in 1924, barring unforeseen ill health. Asked whether he believed that there would be any circumstances under which President Harding would decline to run in 1924, Daugherty told reporters "None, unless his health should fail him." Daugherty's announcement surprised political observers for both its earliness and by the fact that Harding had made no comment. "Why the Attorney General should make the announcement at this time is a subject of comment here," a reporter wrote, adding "It is generally agreed that no Cabinet officer would make a statement so important, particularly one so intimately concerning the President, without the President's express authority." President Harding, who had numerous health problems, died of a heart attack on August 2, 1923, less than five months after Daugherty's announcement.
- Born:
  - Ji Dengkui, member of the Politburo of the Chinese Communist Party during the Cultural Revolution and later a Vice Premier of the People's Republic of China, later forced out after being branded a member of the "Little Gang of Four"; in Wuxiang, Shanxi province (d. 1988)
  - Altaf Gauhar, Pakistani presidential adviser to dictator Ayub Khan; in Gujranwala, Punjab Province, British India (present-day Pakistan) (d. 2000)
  - Tony Leswick, Canadian NHL ice hockey player known as "Tough Tony"; in Humboldt, Saskatchewan (d. 2001)
- Died:
  - Gottlob Honold, 46, German automotive inventor, died from a ruptured appendix (b. 1876)
  - Leopold Mourier, 60, French chef and restaurateur who claimed to have created Lobster Thermidor (b. 1862)

== March 18, 1923 (Sunday) ==
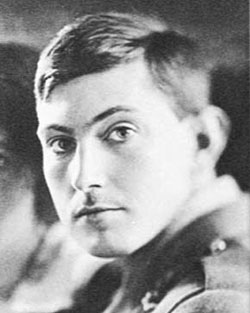
Mountaineer George Mallory: "Because it's there."

- The expression "Because it's there" as a standard reply by explorers asked about why they wish to make a dangerous undertaking, made its entry to the English language after being said by mountain climber George Mallory, or by an interviewer from The New York Times. The newspaper feature read "'Why did you want to climb Mount Everest?' This question was asked of George Leigh Mallory, who was with both expeditions toward the summit of the world's highest mountain, in 1921 and 1923, and who is now in New York. He plans to go again in 1924, and he gave as the reason for persisting in these repeated attempts to reach the top, 'Because it's there.'"
- Voting was held for the 312-member National Assembly of the Kingdom of Serbs, Croats and Slovenes, later referred to as Yugoslavia. Though no party obtained a majority, the People's Radical Party, which had been founded in Serbia, won 108 seats and the Croatian Peasant Party won 70. Nikola Pašić formed a coalition government and remained as Prime Minister of the kingdom.
- Jules Carde was appointed as France's new Governor General of French West Africa, which would later split into nine independent nations Benin (Burkina Faso, Guinea, Ivory Coast, Mauritania, Mali, Niger, Senegal, and Togo). Carde, who would serve for seven years until being appointed to govern French Algeria, would serve until October 15, 1930. He succeeded Martial Merlin, who had been transferred to a new position as Governor-General of French Indochina.
- Born: Claude Bloch, French theoretical nuclear physicist; in Paris (d. 1971)

== March 19, 1923 (Monday) ==
- In Egypt, Lord Carnarvon, financier of the discovery of the tomb of Tutankhamun, was bitten by a mosquito, causing an infection and blood poisoning that would cause his death within two weeks, the first of several that would be sensationalized as the "curse of the pharaohs".
- Born: Henry Morgentaler, Polish-born Canadian physician; as Heniek Morgentaler, in Łódź (d. 2013)

== March 20, 1923 (Tuesday) ==
- The Air Force of El Salvador (Fuerza Aérea Salvadoreña or FAS) was founded.
- A representative for the German Ministry of Finance said that hyperinflation and the occupation of the Ruhr had made it impossible to manage the country's finances, with the budget for 1922–23 showing a deficit of 7.1 trillion (7,100,000,000,000) marks.
- The Soviet Union announced that it was sending 70,000 tons of grain to help workers in the Ruhr.
- Died:
  - Saint Józef Bilczewski, 62, Polish Roman Catholic archbishop canonized in 2005 (b. 1860)
  - George Everard Gibbons, 27, British World War I flying ace who had 18 victories (b. 1896)

== March 21, 1923 (Wednesday) ==
- Jan Cieplak, Konstantin Budkevich and fourteen other Roman Catholic priests were put on trial in the Soviet Union on charges of counter-revolutionary activities. Budkevich would be executed after 10 days.
- The 8-member Royal Commission on London Government, commonly called the Ullswater Commission for its chairman, Viscount Ullswater, published its final reports on possible governmental reform within the boroughs of the 117 square miles (300 km^{2}) County of London, which included the City of London and of Westminster, as well as towns on the outskirts of the borough (Greenwich, Wandsworth, Hackney and Camden). Three reports were issued, with four commissioners recommending almost no change, two urging comprehensive reforms, and two declaring the majority report as "altogether inadequate."
- Born:
  - Rezső Nyers, Hungarian Communist politician and the last General Secretary of the Hungarian Socialist Workers' Party before the democratization of the Hungarian People's Republic in 1989; in Budapest (d. 2018)
  - Nirmala Srivastava, Indian guru and founder of the Sahaja Yoga movement; as Nirmala Salve, in Chhindwara, Central Provinces, British India (present-day India) (d. 2011)
  - Merle Keagle, American professional baseball player in the AAGPBL and the league leader in home runs for the Milwaukee Chicks in 1944; as Merle Patterson, in Tolleson, Arizona (d. 1960)
- Died: Thomas Sanderson, 1st Baron Sanderson, 82, British civil servant (b. 1841)

== March 22, 1923 (Thursday) ==
- The American comic strip Skippy made its first appearance, starting with the first Life weekly humor magazine. Skippy, created by Percy Crosby, would be adapted to cartoons, a radio show and a novel but would end on December 18, 1945, when King Features Syndicate declined to renew its contract after Crosby went on a "sit-down strike" to negotiate for higher fees.
- Born:
  - Marcel Marceau, French mime and film actor; in Strasbourg (d. 2007)
  - Cliff Lewis, American football player, in Cleveland, Ohio (d. 2002)
- Died: Milo D. Campbell, 71, died only seven days after being sworn in as one of the five members of "The Fed", the Federal Reserve Board of Governors that controls U.S. monetary policy. Campbell, who joined on March 15 after being president of the National Milk Producers' Association, was playing golf with former U.S. Senator Charles E. Townsend when he collapsed and died of a cerebral hemorrhage.

== March 23, 1923 (Friday) ==
- The Treaty of Niš was signed between the Kingdom of Serbs, Croats and Slovenes and the Kingdom of Bulgaria, with Bulgaria agreeing not to harbor anti-Yugoslavian terrorists of the Internal Macedonian Revolutionary Organization, in return for Yugoslavian support for Bulgarian claims to lost territories in Thrace and Dobruja.
- The General Staff of the Army of Poland issued an order directing that people of Jewish origin were not to be recruited into specialized units, including the Border Protection Corps, communications, or aviation.
- Cutty Sark, a popular blended Scotch whisky, was introduced by the Berry Bros. & Rudd (BBR) distribution company in Great Britain.
- With odds of more than 16 to 1, the 13-year-old thoroughbred Sergeant Murphy won the Grand National horse race, after 21 of the 28 horses (including the favorite, Arravale) fell during jumping of fences.
- Klubi Sportiv Flamurtari Vlorë, a football club based in Vlorë, Albania, was founded.
- Born: Arnie Weinmeister, Canadian-born AAFC, NFL and CFL football player and inductee into the Pro Football Hall of Fame; in Rhein, Saskatchewan (d. 2000)
- Died: Hovhannes Tumanyan, 54, celebrated Armenian poet

== March 24, 1923 (Saturday) ==
- At least 3,500 people were killed when a 7.3 magnitude earthquake rocked Sichuan Province in China, with an epicenter at the township of Renda. In Luhuo alone, 3,000 people died.
- Soviet Prosecutor Nikolai Krylenko made his closing speech in the trial of 16 priests, demanding the death penalty, "not because we are bloodthirsty, but because this is a political necessity. We must safeguard our regime ... We cannot recognize the defense that they must obey the canons of the church and that first they are priests and afterwards citizens."
- Assumption College, a small higher education institution in the Greendale section of Worcester, Massachusetts, lost the building that held both the college classrooms and the student dormitories, in a fire suspected to be arson. All 130 students were able to escape, and the Roman Catholic college, now Assumption University, continues to operate nearly a century later.
- Double guards were placed at the Reichstag and other key locations around Berlin amid rumors that Adolf Hitler was plotting a coup.
- Oxford University won the 75th annual Boat Race, on the River Thames between the eight-member rowing teams of Oxford and Cambridge University.
- Born:
  - Michael Legat, British writer; in London (d. 2011)
  - Murray Hamilton, American actor; in Washington, North Carolina (d. 1986)
- Died: Ellen Franz, 83, German pianist and actress

== March 25, 1923 (Sunday) ==
- An all-day conference was held in Berlin among members of labour and socialist parties from Germany, England, France, Italy and Belgium searching for a solution to the reparations problem.
- The film Vanity Fair was released.
- Born: Wim van Est, Dutch cyclist; as Willem van Est, in Fijnaart (d. 2003)
- Died: Louis Burstein, 45, Russian-born American film producer known for King Bee Films releases of 180 short films and four full length dramas, including 1922's Forget Me Not, was killed along with one of the passengers in his car when he tried to outrace a train near Pomona, California (b. 1878)

== March 26, 1923 (Monday) ==
- Roman Catholic priests Jan Cieplak and Konstantin Budkevich were sentenced to death for counter-revolutionary activities in the Soviet Union. Thirteen of the other fourteen were given prison sentences and a choir boy was released.
- The strike of 20,000 farm laborers in England began in protest of a pay cut imposed on them, reducing their wages from 25 shillings per week down to 22 shillings.

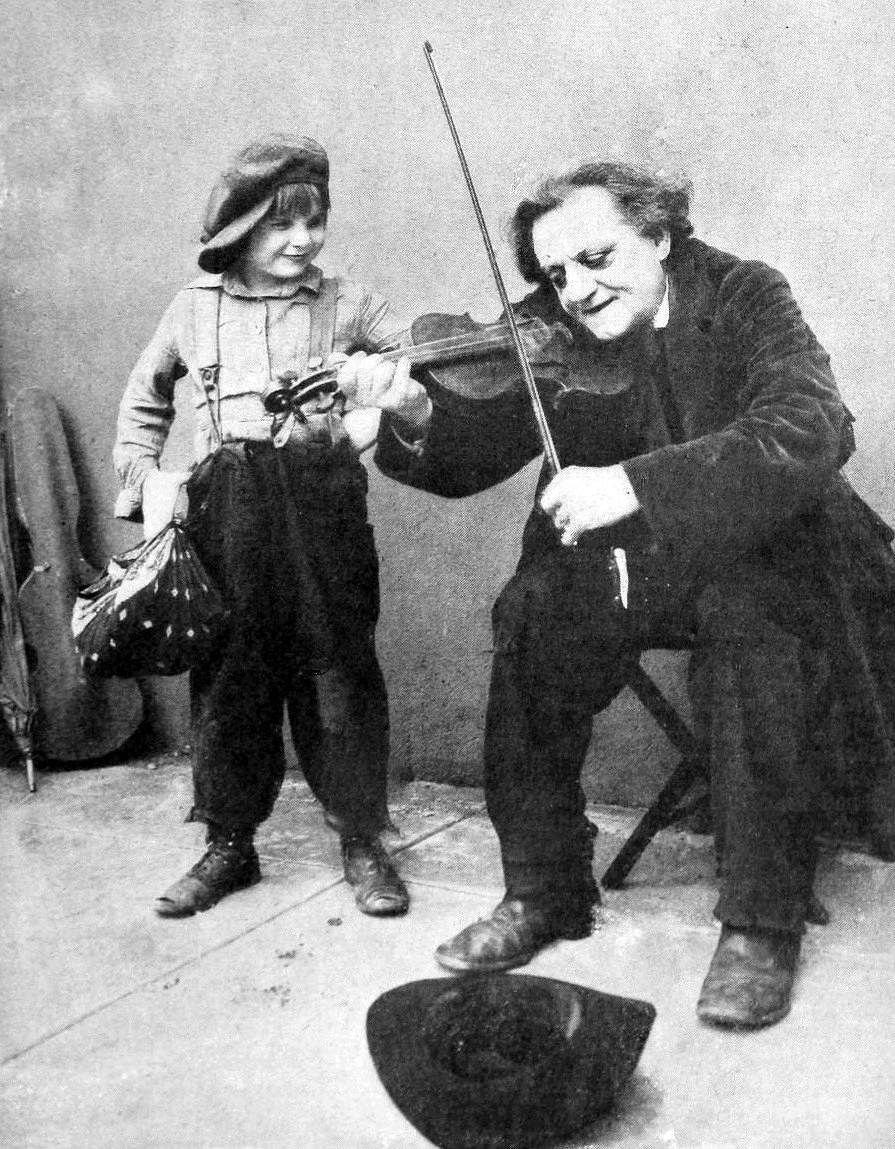
Jackie Coogan and Cesare Gravina

- The silent drama film Daddy, starring Jackie Coogan, was released.
- Born:
  - Bob Elliott, American comedian who was part of the Bob and Ray duo with Ray Goulding; in Boston (d. 2016)
  - Baba Hari Dass, Indian yoga master; in Almora, United Provinces of Agra and Oudh (now Uttarakhand state), British India (d. 2018)

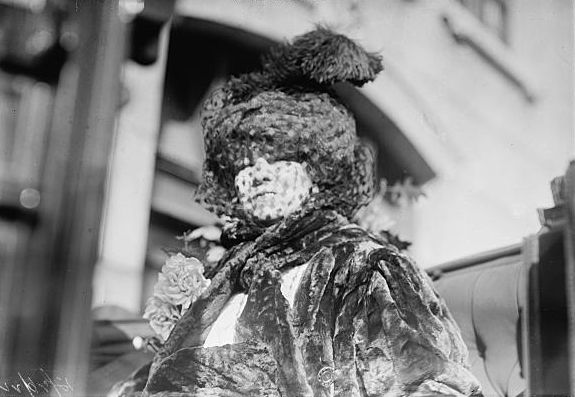
Sarah Bernhardt, three months before her death

- Died: Sarah Bernhardt, 78, French stage and film actress, died in Paris, five days after she had collapsed at home while rehearsing for the filming of a Sacha Guitry movie, La Voyant.

== March 27, 1923 (Tuesday) ==
- Gerald Chapman, called "The Gentleman Bandit" and known for his string of armed robberies with Dutch Anderson and Charles Loeber, escaped from Atlanta Federal Prison after sawing through the bars of his cell and escaping with forger Frank Grey. Both were captured the next day and Chapman was wounded in the process. Chapman escaped from the hospital on April 4 after surgery for bullet wounds in his arm and a kidney and would commit more robberies over the next 18 months.
- The new 1923 Constitution of Romania was approved by the Romanian Senate, 137 to 2, after having passed the Chamber of Deputies the day before, 247 to 8. It came into force two days later.
- A semi-official statement was issued from the Vatican urging suspension of the sentences of the Catholic priests in the Soviet Union. A Soviet official had the executions postponed pending "special instructions."
- Born: Louis Simpson, Jamaican poet; (d. 2012)
- Died: Sir James Dewar, 80, Scottish chemist and physicist (b. 1842)

== March 28, 1923 (Wednesday) ==
- The Italian Royal Air Force (Regia Aeronautica) was founded as an independent service arm of the Italian military.
- The Australian ship SS Douglas Mawson, with 20 people on board— 12 crew and 8 passengers— disappeared and was presumed to have been sunk in a cyclone while passing through the Gulf of Carpentaria. The ship had departed two days earlier from Burketown, Queensland, with an intended destination of the resort of Thursday Island.
- Born: Thad Jones, jazz trumpeter; as Thaddeus Jones, in Pontiac, Michigan (d. 1986)
- Died: Michel-Joseph Maunoury, 75, French general (b. 1847)

== March 29, 1923 (Thursday) ==
- The new Constitution of Romania was ratified.
- Thousands lined the streets of Paris to watch the grand procession of Sarah Bernhardt's funeral coach.
- William Z. Foster took the stand in his own defense in his Michigan criminal trial. Foster denied that he was a member of the Communist Party but said he was a believer in Marxist thought and that he had invited communists to join his Trade Union Educational League.
- A young Mexican woman by the name of Marina Vega broke into Charlie Chaplin's house in the Hollywood Hills. She was cajoled out and removed from the premises, but she broke back in again and was found in Chaplin's bedroom wearing his pajamas. Vega told Chaplin she had come all the way from Mexico City to meet him; Chaplin got her to leave in exchange for promising to buy her a train ticket home.

== March 30, 1923 (Friday) ==
- Benito Mussolini made a famous speech on Italian emigration, declaring that, "For better or for worse, emigration is a physiological necessity of the Italian people. We are forty million people enclosed in our narrow peninsula that has too many mountains, a land that cannot feed everyone." The speech was a defining moment of Mussolini's early premiership as he spun a negative trend into a positive one and offered a justification for expansionism.
- Born: Milton Acorn, Canadian poet and writer; in Charlottetown, Prince Edward Island (d. 1986)

== March 31, 1923 (Saturday) ==
- Eleven employees of Germany's Krupp automobile factory in Essen were killed when French forces opened fire on the passively resisting workers. Two more later died in the hospital.
- The Ottawa Senators defeated the Edmonton Eskimos 1–0 to win the Stanley Cup of hockey, two games to none. King Clancy made history when he became the first player to play all six positions in a game, including two minutes as goaltender while Clint Benedict served a penalty.
- America's first dance marathon ended at the Audubon Ballroom in New York City. At 9:57 p.m., Alma Cummings completed twenty-seven consecutive hours of dancing, having worn out six different male dance partners. The event attracted a great deal of publicity, and dance marathons became a huge fad over the next few months, remaining popular throughout the 1920s and '30s.
- The British Foreign Office announced the release of Egyptian independence activist Saad Zaghloul from exile in Gibraltar, 15 months after his deportation to the island of Malta, followed by further exile on the Seychelles Islands in the South Pacific Ocean. Saad would return to Egypt on September 17, and become Prime Minister of Egypt on January 29, 1924.
- Marina Vega, a deranged fan of film comedian Charlie Chaplin, appeared again at the door of his home, lying down in his driveway after throwing red roses on it. Chaplin's valet thought Vega had shot herself when she mistook an oil-stain on the driveway for blood, and Vega was rushed into the kitchen where she said she had taken poison. An ambulance took her to the hospital where she was treated and released; it was unclear whether Vega had actually poisoned herself.
- Russian gunboats seized a British trawler near Murmansk.
- The government of Turkey pardoned the remaining officers and enlisted men who had been convicted in court-martial proceedings within the Ottoman Empire in 1919 and 1920, and released those who were still in prison.
- Born: Shoshana Damari, Yemeni singer; in Dhamar (d. 2006)

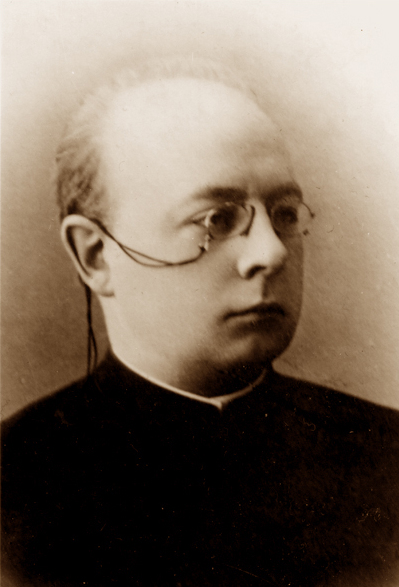
Father Budkevich

- Died: Konstantin Budkevich, 55, Latvian Roman Catholic priest, was executed at Butyrka prison in the Soviet Union, less than three weeks after his March 13 arrest for "anti-Soviet agitation" after passive resistance to the anti-religious campaign conducted by the nation's Communist government. The Central Committee of the Soviet Communist Party had decided on March 29 to commute the death penalty of other convicted priests after appeals from other nations, but declined an offer from Poland to exchange prisoners from the Soviet Union in exchange for Budkevich.
