= USS Pawnee (YT-21) =

Tugboat of the United States Navy

History

United States
- Name: USS Pawnee
- Builder: Rodermund & Co., Tomkins Cove, New York
- Launched: 1896, as John Dwight
- Acquired: by purchase, 6 May 1898
- Commissioned: 6 May 1898
- Decommissioned: 24 March 1922
- Fate: Sold, 25 July 1922

General characteristics
- Type: Tugboat
- Displacement: 275 long tons (279 t)
- Length: 122 ft (37 m)
- Beam: 27 ft 3 in (8.31 m)
- Draft: 7 ft (2.1 m)
- Speed: 10 knots (19 km/h; 12 mph)

USS Pawnee (YT-21) was a yard tug in the United States Navy.

Pawnee was built in 1896 by Rodermund & Co. at Tomkins Cove, New York, as the steam lighter John Dwight. The U.S. Navy purchased her on 6 May 1898 from George T. Moon and commissioned her the same day as USS Pawnee.

Pawnee was assigned to the 3rd Naval District and operated as a harbor tug at the New York Navy Yard in Brooklyn, New York, throughout her career. On 9 April 1910 she had a minor collision with the steamer Bloomsburg (United States) off the New York Navy Yard, resulting in no damage to either vessel.

Pawnee decommissioned on 24 March 1922. She was sold on 25 July 1922 to Seabury & DeZafra, Inc., of New York City.
