= Boardwalk Empire season 4 =

Boardwalk Empire
- Season 4
- DVD cover
- No. of episodes: 12

Release
- Original network: HBO
- Original release: September 8 – November 24, 2013

Season chronology
- ← Previous; Season 3 Next → Season 5

The fourth season of the HBO television series Boardwalk Empire premiered on September 8, 2013, and concluded on November 24, 2013, consisting of 12 episodes. The series was created by Terence Winter and based on the book Boardwalk Empire: The Birth, High Times and Corruption of Atlantic City by Nelson Johnson. Set in Atlantic City, New Jersey, during the Prohibition era, the series stars Steve Buscemi as Enoch "Nucky" Thompson (based on the historical Enoch L. Johnson), a political figure who rose to prominence and controlled Atlantic City, New Jersey, during the Prohibition period of the 1920s and early 1930s. The fourth season takes place between February and August, 1924. The fourth season was released on DVD and Blu-ray in region 1 on August 19, 2014.

== Cast and characters ==
=== Main cast ===
Ron Livingston and Jeffrey Wright joined the main cast, while Charlie Cox and Bobby Cannavale departed.

- Steve Buscemi as Enoch "Nucky" Thompson, the former treasurer of Atlantic County, New Jersey, now a full-time bootlegger.
- Kelly Macdonald as Margaret Thompson, Nucky's estranged wife who's now working at a business firm in New York City.
- Michael Shannon as Nelson Van Alden/George Mueller, a former prohibition agent and former iron salesman who is now a debt collector for the Capones and works as an undercover agent for them by disguising himself as O'Banion's henchman and florist at his flower shop.
- Shea Whigham as Elias "Eli" Thompson, Nucky's younger brother and the former sheriff of Atlantic City who now is co-owner of one of Nucky's alcohol warehouses.
- Michael Stuhlbarg as Arnold Rothstein, a New York gangster and gambler whose luck in gambling is going down.
- Stephen Graham as Al Capone, a Chicago gangster who seeks to make it big.
- Vincent Piazza as Charlie Luciano, a New York gangster and Masseria's enforcer and associate who also plans to make it big.
- Michael Kenneth Williams as Albert "Chalky" White, a black gangster, Nucky's business partner, leader of Atlantic City's black community, and owner of the Onyx Club who faces trouble and a threat from Dr. Narcisse.
- Anthony Laciura as Eddie Kessler, Nucky's bumbling German butler who suffers from his boss's verbal abuse and decides to make it big himself.
- Paul Sparks as Mickey Doyle, a comedic Polish-American gangster and one of Nucky's business partners who co-owns one of his main alcohol warehouses with Eli.
- Jack Huston as Richard Harrow, a WW1 veteran, former enforcer for Jimmy Darmody, and former bodyguard of the Artemis Club who is now a contract killer and assassin hoping to reunite with his sister.
- Ron Livingston as Roy Phillips, a Piggly Wiggly businessman who becomes Gillian's lover however is secretly a Pinkerton agent set up by Leander Whitlock.
- Jeffrey Wright as Dr. Valentin Narcisse, a Harlem Doctor of Divinity and bootlegger who has a feud with Chalky White.
- Gretchen Mol as Gillian Darmody, the mother of deceased Jimmy, Tommy's grandmother, and the former madame of the Artemis Club who is now suffering from heroin addiction.

=== Recurring ===
- Brian Geraghty as Agent Warren Knox/James "Jim" Tolliver
- Margot Bingham as Daughter Maitland
- Ben Rosenfield as Willie Thompson
- Domenick Lombardozzi as Ralph Capone
- Patricia Arquette as Sally Wheet
- Erik LaRay Harvey as Dunn Purnsley
- Christina Jackson as Maybelle White
- Eric Ladin as J. Edgar Hoover
- Brady and Connor Noon as Tommy Darmody
- Wrenn Schmidt as Julia Sagorsky
- Jacob A. Ware as Federal Agent Selby
- Greg Antonacci as Johnny Torrio
- Mark Borkowski as Paul Sagorsky
- Kayla Ferguson as Doris
- Will Janowitz as Hymie Weiss
- Charlie Plummer as Michael Thompson
- Kevin O'Rourke as Edward L. Bader
- Christiane Seidel as Sigrid Mueller
- Arron Shiver as Dean O'Banion
- Morgan Spector as Frank Capone
- Natalie Wachen as Lenore White
- Katherine Waterston as Emma Harrow
- Anatol Yusef as Meyer Lansky
- Pearce Bunting as Bill McCoy
- Chris Caldovino as Tonino Sandrelli
- Joe Caniano as Jake Guzik
- Dominic Chianese as Leander Whitlock
- Ivo Nandi as Joe Masseria
- Stephen Root as Gaston Means
- Vincenzo Amato as Vincenzo Petrucelli
- Josie and Lucy Gallina as Emily Schroeder
- Declan and Rory McTigue as Theodore "Teddy" Schroeder
- Fredric Lehne as Owney Madden
- Joseph Riccobene as Frankie Yale
- Joseph Aniska as Agent Stan Sawicki
- James Cromwell as Andrew W. Mellon
- Stephen DeRosa as Eddie Cantor
- Glenn Fleshler as George Remus
- Peter McRobbie as Supervisor Frederick Elliot
- Julianne Nicholson as Esther Randolph

== Episodes ==
No. overall	No. in season	Title	Directed by	Written by	Original release date	US viewers (millions)
37	1	"New York Sour"	Tim Van Patten	Howard Korder	September 8, 2013	2.38
February 1924. Nucky, preferring to stay in his room up in the Albatross Hotel and away from the boardwalk, comes to a peace agreement with Masseria and Rothstein. Richard, on his way home to reunite with his sister, leaves some corpses in his wake. Gillian, still an addict but desperate to get her grandson back, is resorting to prostitution until a stranger shows up with a better offer. Revenue Agent Sawicki's new partner, Warren Knox, isn't as naive as he acts. Chalky tries to run the Onyx Club quietly but his right-hand man, Dunn Purnsley, gets into a mess of trouble with a booking-agent and his wife.
38	2	"Resignation"	Alik Sakharov	Dennis Lehane and Howard Korder	September 15, 2013	2.21
Chalky is pressured by Valentin Narcisse, a Harlem kingpin who knows what Dunn did. At home, Van Alden must deal with his new stubbornly middle-class wife Sigrid; at work, he has to deal with an angry Al Capone. Knox's true boss, it turns out, is J. Edgar Hoover. Before he leaves for Florida to visit an old friend, Nucky placates a frustrated Eddie with a promotion. Valentin Narcisse puts an end to the conflict with the booking-agent's wife by having her killed by his men.
39	3	"Acres of Diamonds"	Allen Coulter	Terence Winter	September 22, 2013	1.87
While in Tampa visiting Bill McCoy, Nucky becomes intrigued by Sally Wheet, a local bar owner. Roy has Gillian pretend to be his wife. Narcisse meets with Rothstein and later books singer Daughter Maitland for the Onyx Club. For a party at college, Eli's son Willie tries to finagle some booze from Mickey's warehouse. Richard finds himself in some trouble and his sister comes to his aid.
40	4	"All In"	Ed Bianchi	David Matthews	September 29, 2013	1.99
Federal agents close in on Nucky's ring. Narcisse recruits Dunn. Van Alden learns that Al and Frank Capone are more brutal jokers than O'Banion. Willie's revenge-prank goes horribly wrong. Rothstein's way of dealing with his bad luck at the card table leads Nucky to make Lansky his partner in the Florida scheme. After a night on the town with Ralph Capone, Eddie pays for it in the morning when he's arrested by Knox.
41	5	"Erlkönig"	Tim Van Patten	Howard Korder	October 6, 2013	2.09
Knox torments Eddie and reveals his dark past, pushing him to betrayal. Willie, arrested over the death of schoolmate Henry Gaines, phones Nucky. Gillian, desperate to regain custody of Tommy but losing her grip, turns to Dunn for a fix. Van Alden is enlisted by Frank and Al Capone to bust some Democrat supporters' heads; Frank is shot by deputized Chicago agents. Nucky has Willie stick to a false alibi, pays off the Philadelphia DA to free him and leaves him with some avuncular advice shortly before Willie's roommate is arrested for Gaines' death. Eddie, back at the Albatross and guilt-ridden about betraying Nucky's trust, jumps out of his window to his death.
42	6	"The North Star"	Allen Coulter	Eric Overmyer and Howard Korder	October 13, 2013	1.90
Nucky and Margaret have a strained meeting at Penn Station before he goes to Florida. While investigating Eddie's death, Eli finds Eddie's key for the safety-deposit box at the bank but isn't allowed access to it. Richard returns and comes across Paul Sagorsky after he's just received stark news from his doctor. Chalky draws closer to Daughter Maitland. Knox, pretending to be a Prohibition agent again, returns to Mickey's warehouse but can't escape Eddie's shadow. In Tampa, Nucky, Lansky and Luciano meet with a new partner brought in by Bill. Julia tells Richard what she needs. Nucky gets into more than just business with a feisty, hard-drinking Sally.
43	7	"William Wilson"	Jeremy Podeswa	David Matthews and Terence Winter	October 20, 2013	2.16
As news of Leopold and Loeb's arrest hits the papers, Al Capone, still angry and grief-stricken over Frank's death, kills a policeman. Rothstein runs into Margaret at her work, which is not entirely above-board. Dunn deals with church concern about his heroin in the community. Willie drops out of college—infuriating his father—and turns to Nucky for work. After Johnny Torrio is arrested at a distillery that he just bought from O'Banion, he orders Capone to kill him. Roy helps Gillian kick her habit but confesses to an obsession of his own. Agent Knox is actually Jim Tolliver, as Gaston Means has secretly known all along. Daughter Maitland reveals that her true allegiance is to Dr. Narcisse—not Chalky—for horribly personal reasons.
44	8	"The Old Ship of Zion"	Tim Van Patten	Cristine Chambers and Howard Korder	October 27, 2013	1.91
Tolliver hears about Willie's evasion of the law and pursues Eli as a way to end Nucky's empire. Chalky busts one of Narcisse's drug houses, with two-faced Dunn along for the show. Nucky has a nasty surprise when Sally rides up to Atlantic City with the new bootlegging delivery from Tampa. Narcisse employs Daughter Maitland to way-lay Chalky but she can't bring herself to let Dunn kill Chalky and stabs him fatally in the back.
45	9	"Marriage and Hunting"	Ed Bianchi	David Matthews & Jennifer Ames & Steve Turner	November 3, 2013	1.90
Gillian opens up to Roy; Julia proposes to Richard. Eager to assert his power at home, Van Alden offers to kill O'Banion for Capone but old business gets in the way. Narcisse punishes Daughter for her betrayal, pushing Chalky towards a war Nucky refuses to join. After Frankie Yale, John Scalise and Albert Anselmi kill O'Banion at his shop counter, Van Alden takes $1,000 over his corpse. Rothstein negotiates an insurance plan with Nucky. Chalky's daughter Maybelle discovers her father's affair with Daughter. Newlywed Richard asks Nucky for a job.
46	10	"White Horse Pike"	Jake Paltrow	Dave Flebotte	November 10, 2013	2.08
Sally discovers heroin being slipped into shipments by Luciano and Lansky for Masseria. Chalky fails to kill Narcisse and is wounded. Margaret does an insider-deal for Rothstein in return for new lodgings. Capone, while trying to nudge Torrio into retirement, is saved by Van Alden from a tommy-gun ambush. Despite Tolliver's turning of Eli, Hoover is still uninterested in scotching the bootleggers' network. Nucky is forced into a deal with Narcisse after learning he is Masseria's partner in the heroin pipeline. Nucky promises Chalky to Narcisse but tells Mayor Bader to have cops slip Chalky out of town; too late, though, he discovers through Willie that Bader is in Narcisse's pocket. Chalky and Daughter narrowly escape the police; Narcisse eyes Maybelle; Nucky, Eli and Willie gather to decide their next move.
47	11	"Havre de Grace"	Allen Coulter	Howard Korder	November 17, 2013	1.98
Chalky and Daughter arrive at Havre de Grace to stay with Oscar Boneau, his old mentor. Gillian says goodbye to Tommy and looks forward to a life with Roy when he proposes to her. Knox pressures Eli to set up a meeting between the East Coast bosses in the network. Chalky wakes to find Daughter gone; some of Narcisse's men descend on the house, killing blind Oscar before being killed by his men. Gillian is tricked by Roy, who is actually a Pinkerton agent, into confessing to killing Roger. Nucky agrees to the peace-brokering meeting that Eli suggests but he realizes Knox is the "skunk in his cellar" that Gaston Means had referred to in a phone call and that he's turned Eli.
48	12	"Farewell Daddy Blues"	Tim Van Patten	Terence Winter and Howard Korder	November 24, 2013	2.18
Chalky confronts Nucky at gunpoint and demands they get rid of Narcisse. Richard asks Nucky where Jimmy is buried to keep Gillian in jail; in return, Nucky employs him for a hit. Richard sends Julia, Tommy, and Paul to his sister. Nucky tells Narcisse that Chalky wants to meet. After an attempt on Torrio narrowly fails, he puts Capone in charge. Knox/Tolliver sets up an eavesdrop for the big meeting but no one shows; Eli is called to the Albatross, where Nucky puts a gun to his head until Willie intervenes. Tolliver confronts Eli in his home; they fight and Eli beats him to death. Chalky meets Narcisse at the Onyx but his bluff of giving Daughter's whereabouts is met by Narcisse revealing that he has Chalky's daughter Maybelle. From his sniper position, Richard hesitates long enough that, when he pulls the trigger, Maybelle has moved to the table and into the shot; she is killed and Richard is mortally wounded by one of Narcisse's men. Narcisse is arrested and turned by Hoover into an informant on Marcus Garvey. Chalky retreats to Havre de Grace. Nucky sends Eli off to Chicago, where he is met by Van Alden. Richard, imagining his reunion with his new family in Wisconsin, his war wounds healed, dies peacefully under the pier.

== Reception ==
=== Critical reception ===
The fourth season of Boardwalk Empire received positive reviews from critics. On the review aggregator website Metacritic, the fourth season scored 77/100 based on 13 reviews. Another aggregator website, Rotten Tomatoes, gave the fourth season a 98% rating based on 43 reviews, with an average score of 8/10. The site consensus read, "Boardwalk Empire continues to benefit from its meticulously realized period trappings, but what keeps the show watchable is its supremely talented ensemble players."

=== Awards and nominations ===
For the 20th Screen Actors Guild Awards, the cast was nominated for Best Drama Ensemble, Steve Buscemi was nominated for Best Drama Actor, and the series was nominated for Best Stunt Team. Jeffrey Wright received a nomination for Best Supporting Actor in a Drama Series for the 4th Critics' Choice Television Awards. For the 66th Primetime Emmy Awards, Tim Van Patten was nominated for Outstanding Directing for a Drama Series for the episode "Farewell Daddy Blues".
