= William Wilson (Boardwalk Empire) =

- Boardwalk Empire episode
- Episode no.: Season 4 Episode 7
- Directed by: Jeremy Podeswa
- Written by: David Matthews; Terence Winter
- Cinematography by: David Franco
- Editing by: Kate Sanford
- Original air date: October 20, 2013
- Running time: 57 minutes

Guest appearances
- James Cromwell as Andrew Mellon; Stephen Root as Gaston Means; Julianne Nicholson as Esther Randolph; Brian Geraghty as Agent Warren Knox; Ben Rosenfield as Willie Thompson; Domenick Lombardozzi as Ralph Capone; Erik LaRay Harvey as Dunn Purnsley; Chris Caldovino as Tonino Sandrelli; Greg Antonacci as Johnny Torrio; Ivo Nandi as Joe Masseria; Arron Shiver as Dean O'Banion; Eric Ladin as J. Edgar Hoover; Patch Darragh as Robert Bennett III; Glenn Fleshler as George Remus

Episode chronology
← Previous "The North Star"	Next → "The Old Ship of Zion"
- Boardwalk Empire (season 4)

"William Wilson" is the seventh episode of the fourth season of the American period crime drama television series Boardwalk Empire. It is the 43rd overall episode of the series and was written by David Matthews and series creator Terence Winter, and directed by Jeremy Podeswa. It was released on HBO on October 20, 2013.

The series is set in Atlantic City, New Jersey, during the Prohibition era of the 1920s. The series follows Enoch "Nucky" Thompson, a political figure who rises to prominence and interacts with mobsters, politicians, government agents, and the common folk who look up to him. In the episode, Knox's connection is revealed, while Margaret meets her new associate. Meanwhile, Willie takes a decision, and Capone wants retribution for Frank's death.

According to Nielsen Media Research, the episode was seen by an estimated 2.16 million household viewers and gained a 0.8 ratings share among adults aged 18–49. The episode received positive reviews from critics, who praised the performances and production values, while criticizing the lack of progress in the storylines.

== Plot ==
In Chicago, a grief-stricken Capone kills a policeman in the streets. This infuriates Torrio for the unwanted attention, so he orders Capone to not go after Dean O'Banion, whom the latter believes paid the detectives to kill his brother Frank. Torrio is convinced of O'Banion's innocence, but they are later arrested by the police when O'Banion sells a brewery to Torrio. After being released, Torrio gives permission to Capone to kill O'Banion.

In New York City, Margaret works at a shady Wall Street brokerage firm. She is astounded to find that her boss, Robert Bennett III, is doing business with "Abe Redstone", who is actually Rothstein. Rothstein decides to invest in the firm and even gives $100 to Margaret. Meanwhile, Gillian is tended by Roy, who helps her in her detox.

Nucky gets Gaston Means to investigate Knox, but is disappointed when very little information is found. His fears grow when he loses contact with Supervisor Elliot, who - according to Means - has retired. In Washington, D.C., Knox, J. Edgar Hoover, Andrew Mellon and Esther Randolph meet with George Remus to disclose any information on Nucky's operations. Afterwards, they meet newly appointed Attorney General Harlan F. Stone, where Hoover is pronounced as the newest Director of the Bureau of Investigation. However, Knox walks out of the meeting when Hoover takes credit for his work. He then meets with Means, revealing that the latter works for him, and Knox's real name is James Tolliver.

Haunted by Henry's death, Willie announces to his family that he has chosen to drop out of Temple University, infuriating Eli who slaps his son and kicks him out of his house. Willie then shows up at the Albatross, asking Nucky for a job.

Chalky continues his affair with singer Daughter Maitland, which forces Narcisse and Dunn Purnsley to handle operations in his place. However, it is revealed that Daughter is conspiring with Narcisse, who sent her to seduce Chalky for his own purposes. Meanwhile, Purnsley kills Deacon Cuffy, who threatened to disclose the news about Dunn's heroin trade to Chalky White.

== Production ==
=== Development ===
In September 2013, HBO confirmed that the seventh episode of the season would be titled "William Wilson", and that it would be written by David Matthews and series creator Terence Winter, and directed by Jeremy Podeswa. This was Matthews' second writing credit, Winter's eleventh writing credit, and Podeswa's sixth directing credit.

== Reception ==
=== Viewers ===
In its original American broadcast, "William Wilson" was seen by an estimated 2.16 million household viewers with a 0.8 in the 18-49 demographics. This means that 0.8 percent of all households with televisions watched the episode. This was a 13% increase in viewership from the previous episode, which was watched by 1.90 million household viewers with a 0.7 in the 18-49 demographics.

=== Critical reviews ===
"William Wilson" received positive reviews from critics. Matt Fowler of IGN gave the episode a "good" 7.6 out of 10 and wrote, "'William Wilson' inched the story forward, with the biggest movement probably coming from Narcisse and Knox. Nothing outstanding happened, but I did like the whole "Leopold and Loeb" backdrop. In fact, that story more than the Poe story probably influenced this installment. 'Supermen' convinced they didn't have to adhere to the norms and morals of regular society."

Genevieve Valentine of The A.V. Club gave the episode a "B+" grade and wrote, "This episode lacks some of the thematic punch of others this season, but it does a yeoman's work. Things are coming together; it's a storm that's still on the horizon, but occasionally, even those trapped in the middle of it can sense when the winds are changing."

Alan Sepinwall of HitFix wrote, "I know the assumption is that Narcisse will be dispensed with by the end of the year, but I wouldn't be surprised in the slightest if a lot of the stories introduced this season were designed to carry over into next year. And given what a reliable performer Boardwalk has been for HBO, I'm fine with that." Seth Colter Walls of Vulture gave the episode a 3 star rating out of 5 and wrote, "So, it's official: The show doesn't want us to think too hard about the timeline of this shifting balance of power between Chalky and Dunn. Which is a shame, because I think it has something to do with why the balance of the Chalky-Dunn-Narcisse angle feels so perfunctory through the rest of the hour."

Rodrigo Perez of IndieWire wrote, "There are traitors in our midst and they are myriad. Named after the Edgar Allan Poe poem that appears in William Thompson's college lecture, Boardwalk Empire episode 'William Wilson' centers thematically on duplicity, doppelgangers, and those who are not what they appear to be." Chris O'Hara of TV Fanatic gave the episode a perfect 5 star rating out of 5 and wrote, "A lot went down this week, but the overall quality and flow of the episode didn't suffer in the slightest. If this continues to be the case, we will be in for a wild ride to the end of this season for sure."

Michael Noble of Den of Geek wrote, "A sense of identity and reinvention permeates his life as much as it does his work and that is particularly true of Boardwalk Empire, and especially this episode." Paste gave the episode a 6 out of 10 rating and wrote, "Several scenes in 'William Wilson' had me tense or shocked, as is almost always the case with Boardwalk Empire, but getting between them felt interminably long this week. Of course I'd prefer it if the show's creators to focus on their few truly interesting storylines and drop the rest or at least give them less screentime, but I fear that if they were asked to do so they’d have no idea which is which."
