= Acres of Diamonds (Boardwalk Empire) =

- Boardwalk Empire episode
- Episode no.: Season 4 Episode 3
- Directed by: Allen Coulter
- Written by: Terence Winter
- Cinematography by: David Franco
- Editing by: Kate Sanford
- Original air date: September 22, 2013
- Running time: 56 minutes

Guest appearances
- Patricia Arquette as Sally Wheet; Ben Rosenfield as Willie Thompson; Erik LaRay Harvey as Dunn Purnsley; Andrew Howard as August Tucker; Fredric Lehne as Owney Madden; Sean Cullen as Carl Billings

Episode chronology
← Previous "Resignation"	Next → "All In"
- Boardwalk Empire (season 4)

"Acres of Diamonds" is the third episode of the fourth season of the American period crime drama television series Boardwalk Empire. It is the 39th overall episode of the series and was written by series creator Terence Winter, and directed by Allen Coulter. It was released on HBO on September 22, 2013.

The series is set in Atlantic City, New Jersey, during the Prohibition era of the 1920s. The series follows Enoch "Nucky" Thompson, a political figure who rises to prominence and interacts with mobsters, politicians, government agents, and the common folk who look up to him. In the episode, Nucky goes to Florida, while Richard's past catches up with him.

According to Nielsen Media Research, the episode was seen by an estimated 1.87 million household viewers and gained a 0.7 ratings share among adults aged 18–49. The episode received positive reviews from critics, who praised the performances and character development, but criticized the pacing and lack of progress.

== Plot ==
At Temple University, Willie finds out about an upcoming party that his friends are throwing. Wanting to impress a girl named Doris, he claims that he can bring liquor. He goes to Mickey's warehouse, but Mickey rebuffs his request. He tries to steal a crate but is caught, prompting Mickey to slap him. Taking pity on him, however, Mickey allows him to take a crate, warning him not to tell Eli. During the party, Willie defends Doris from a man making unwanted advances. Doris takes him to the library, where they kiss. The encounter is interrupted by Willie's classmates, who mock him. As he tells them off, the classmates humiliate him by pointing out his erection. This prompts Willie to leave the party.

In Wisconsin, Richard gives money to Emma, claiming she must pay her debts. However, Emma claims she already paid them. Richard is later confronted by Billings and his henchman, with the former upset with Richard for not completing his job in Milwaukee. Richard kills the henchman, while Emma kills Billings with a shotgun. Deciding that his presence will bring problems, Richard chooses to leave. They part on good terms, with Emma telling him that he will have to account for all his actions.

Meanwhile, in New York, Narcisse meets with Rothstein and Owney Madden to discuss a potential heroin partnership. During this meeting, Narcisse decides to employ a singer, Daughter Maitland, to perform at the Onyx Club. He gets Chalky to accept Maitland, and Chalky actually becomes smitten with her. Shortly thereafter, Narcisse starts to drive a wedge between Chalky and Dunn, and influences Dunn into using heroin.

Back in Atlantic City, Gillian continues seeing Roy Phillips. During an encounter, Roy asks her to pretend to be his wife, as he wants to impress an A&P executive. While their ruse proves to be successful, Gillian is later recognized at a diner by a former friend of Roger and starts to talk about his actions until Roy forces him to leave. Ashamed, Gillian once again resorts to heroin.

In Tampa, Florida, Nucky meets with Bill McCoy. McCoy wants Nucky to buy a large parcel of land, which he intends to use for his operations. However, Nucky discovers that another developer has plans for the surrounding land, making Nucky’s parcel unusable to him. When he tells McCoy that he will have to pull back on the deal, McCoy explains that he is indebted to another bootlegger, August Tucker. While Nucky understands his situation, he is frustrated that McCoy didn't ask for his help first. Nucky then goes to a speakeasy, where he becomes intrigued by Sally Wheet, the owner. Inspired by their conversation, Nucky accepts McCoy’s proposal to buy the land. Unbeknownst to Nucky, McCoy killed Tucker earlier that day when Tucker came to harass McCoy over a debt.

== Production ==
In August 2013, HBO confirmed that the third episode of the season would be titled "Acres of Diamonds", and that it would be written by series creator Terence Winter, and directed by Allen Coulter. This was Winter's tenth writing credit, and Coulter's seventh directing credit.

== Reception ==
=== Viewers ===
In its original American broadcast, "Acres of Diamonds" was seen by an estimated 1.87 million household viewers with a 0.7 in the 18-49 demographics. This means that 0.7 percent of all households with televisions watched the episode. This was a 16% decrease in viewership from the previous episode, which was watched by 2.21 million household viewers with a 0.9 in the 18-49 demographics.

=== Critical reviews ===
"Acres of Diamonds" received positive reviews from critics. Matt Fowler of IGN gave the episode a "great" 8.3 out of 10 and wrote, "'Acres of Diamonds' had a few patchy spots, and everyone aside from Chalky and Nucky (and William, I suppose) seems to be locked into an orbit for now, but I really enjoyed the idea of Nucky getting a change of scenery. Everything he'd gained from his years as a bootlegger, from a love standpoint, had also been taken away from him - giving him zero-sum decade. Time to soak up the sun."

Genevieve Valentine of The A.V. Club gave the episode a "B" grade and wrote, "This week, Boardwalk Empire covers a considerable swath of geography, leaping up and down the East Coast and taking a detour into Wisconsin. But for an episode that covers so much ground, the claustrophobia is palpable, both in its story and in its framing. Almost everywhere, the characters are trapped in low, close places."

Alan Sepinwall of HitFix wrote, "it's easy to imagine 'Acres of Diamonds' getting completely lost in the shuffle. We get to see Dr. Narcisse make cagey new alliances with both Rothstein and Dunn Purnsley, we see Richard's attempt at a peaceful retirement fall apart when his sister Emma is forced to kill a man to save his life, and we see Gillian get understandably shaken up when she runs into a friend of the late Jimmy lookalike Roger. But it's largely a transitional episode, and also one that devotes a large chunk of time to Willie Thompson trying get booze for a campus party." Seth Colter Walls of Vulture gave the episode a 3 star rating out of 5 and criticized Gillian's role, "I mean, it's nice to have Gillian's arc brought in sync with something else on Boardwalk, but that decision doesn't really scan."

Rodrigo Perez of IndieWire wrote, "A bridge building type of narrative, the worst example of 'chess piece' writing is an episode wherein almost nothing really happens and instead the seeds are sown for action down the road. Sure, something always happens, but the worst offenders are overt about the fact that every dramatic event that took place is simply in service for a bigger narrative beat down line — episodes turn into a long lead ramp to the main event which renders middle episodes a type of slow-moving stasis." Chris O'Hara of TV Fanatic gave the episode a 4 star rating out of 5 and wrote, "Yes, there was a lot of talk about the future on 'Acres of Diamond,' but the past played catch up with Gillian and Richard and Eli's son just tried to fit in with his classmates."

Michael Noble of Den of Geek wrote, "Like so many of its characters, Boardwalk Empire is wearing a mask. It will slip in time, but for now, I'll gladly admire the beautiful façade." Paste gave the episode a 6.2 out of 10 rating and wrote, "That's some very diffuse action, and yes, with so many settings it creates an epic feel. But with so few of these stories particularly compelling, it's hard to care too much about the scope."
