= New York Sour (Boardwalk Empire) =

- Boardwalk Empire episode
- Episode no.: Season 4 Episode 1
- Directed by: Tim Van Patten
- Written by: Howard Korder
- Cinematography by: David Franco
- Editing by: Kate Sanford
- Original air date: September 8, 2013
- Running time: 59 minutes

Guest appearances
- Dominic Chianese as Leander Whitlock; Anatol Yusef as Meyer Lansky; Brian Geraghty as Warren Knox; Domenick Lombardozzi as Ralph Capone; Ben Rosenfield as Willie Thompson; Erik LaRay Harvey as Dunn Purnsley; Chris Caldovino as Tonino Sandrelli; Ivo Nandi as Joe Masseria; Wrenn Schmidt as Julia Sagorsky; Greg Antonacci as Johnny Torrio; Stephen DeRosa as Eddie Cantor; Morgan Spector as Frank Capone

Episode chronology
← Previous "Margate Sands"	Next → "Resignation"
- Boardwalk Empire (season 4)

"New York Sour" is the first episode of the fourth season of the American period crime drama television series Boardwalk Empire. It is the 37th overall episode of the series and was written by executive producer Howard Korder and directed by executive producer Tim Van Patten. It was released on HBO on September 8, 2013.

The series is set in Atlantic City, New Jersey, during the Prohibition era of the 1920s. The series follows Enoch "Nucky" Thompson, a political figure who rises to prominence and interacts with mobsters, politicians, government agents, and the common folk who look up to him. In the episode, Nucky has abstained from the boardwalk while continuing business with Chalky and Eli. Meanwhile, Richard leaves on a trip, while Gillian is forced to resort to prostitution.

According to Nielsen Media Research, the episode was seen by an estimated 2.38 million household viewers and gained a 0.9 ratings share among adults aged 18–49. The episode received mostly positive reviews, who praised the performances and directing, but criticizing the pacing.

== Plot ==
In February 1924, Richard Harrow goes to Warsaw, Indiana, and kills two men in order to retrieve the address of an insurance company. With the paper in his possession, he then goes to Michigan and holds a businessman at gunpoint. When the man provides him with a name and an address, Richard kills him and leaves.

Meanwhile, in Chicago, Al Capone has brought his brothers Frank and Ralph to help with his operations alongside Johnny Torrio. Capone and Torrio are interested in influencing upcoming municipal elections. Later, Capone has a reporter assaulted for writing an article about him, but only because the reporter misspelled his last name.

Back in Atlantic City, Chalky White has opened his new club, the Onyx Club, but feels dissatisfied with the performers. His partnership with Dickie Pastor, a talent agent, is put in jeopardy when Chalky's right-hand man, Dunn Purnsley, is caught having sex with Dickie's wife Alma. Dickie holds Dunn at gunpoint. However, instead of killing Dunn, he orders him to continue having sex with Alma, revealing the couple conspired to trick Dunn as part of their shared fetish. After initially pretending to play along, Dunn kills Dickie while Alma flees. The situation angers Chalky, as Dickie was connected to mobster Owney Madden.

Nucky Thompson now lives in the Albatross Hotel and has an office on the top floor of the Onyx Club. There, he meets with Joe Masseria and Arnold Rothstein, who are both upset over his actions in the past year. Nevertheless, they both agree to put aside their differences, with Masseria placated by Nucky's offer of a suitcase of money. Nucky meets an attractive young dancer who attempts to seduce him in his suite. When she mentions the now deceased Billie's Broadway success was likely due to her relationship with Nucky, he realizes she is using him to advance her career. Nucky feigns interest and excuses himself, ultimately having his butler Eddie send her away.

Nucky's brother Eli now manages the warehouse with Mickey Doyle, supervising work with Agent Sawicki and his new partner, Warren Knox, although the latter proves to be naive and insecure. Eli's son, Willie, is disappointed that he is kept from becoming involved in the business. Willie asks Nucky for help but is told that he should focus on his studies at Temple University. One of their associates, Elmer Borst, pays Knox to protect a barn under which liquor is stored. Knox convinces Sawicki to steal the liquor, knowingly leading him into a trap that kills Sawicki. When Borst comes out to investigate, Knox kills him.

Gillian attends a trial in which Julia wants to maintain custody of Tommy. The judge berates her for her current living situation and calls upon Gillian and Julia to explain the circumstances under which Tommy came into the care of Julia. Neither would explain, so the judge adjourns. With a lack of funds, she is forced to sell her house and work as a prostitute. During an open house, Gillian meets Roy Phillips, a Piggly Wiggly executive who is interested in spending time with her. Somewhere, Richard arrives at a house. As he tries to find a way to enter, he is held at gunpoint by a woman, revealed to be his sister Emma.

== Production ==
=== Development ===
In August 2013, HBO confirmed that the first episode of the season would be titled "New York Sour", and that it would be written by executive producer Howard Korder, and directed by executive producer Tim Van Patten. This was Korder's twelfth writing credit, and Van Patten's 13th directing credit.

== Reception ==
=== Viewers ===
In its original American broadcast, "New York Sour" was seen by an estimated 2.38 million household viewers with a 0.9 in the 18-49 demographics. This means that 0.9 percent of all households with televisions watched the episode. This was a 13% decrease in viewership from the previous episode, which was watched by 2.73 million household viewers with a 0.9 in the 18-49 demographics.

=== Critical reviews ===
"New York Sour" received mostly positive reviews from critics. Matt Fowler of IGN gave the episode a "great" 8.2 out of 10 and wrote, "'New Your Sour' was engrossing from a 'here's where everyone is now' standpoint, but it offered very little in the way of trajectory. It's notable the the [sic] main poster - the Season 4 key art - for this year features Nucky, Eli, and Chalky as the most prominent figures, because that's who's featured the most here. No Margaret (which fits, because it would be weird to follow her separate adventures) and no Van Alden, but they weren't missed."

Genevieve Valentine of The A.V. Club gave the episode a "B+" grade and wrote, "But for major themes this season, you see them set out in the first two minutes: Never underestimate a man alone; survival is a performance art. Neither of these is any surprise, in a show so much about the lies (and the corpses) on which empires are built, but this episode leaves us in no doubt that this season, the actors have it, and he who stands alone might stand last."

Alan Sepinwall of HitFix wrote, "Season 4 gets off to a very promising start by having the first spot of trouble originate in Chalky's corner of this world." Seth Colter Walls of Vulture gave the episode a 3 star rating out of 5 and wrote, "even if it's not as perfectly smooth-at-every-moment, it's good to have the chaotic, occasionally profound Boardwalk Empire back on the scene. As a cold-bitten realist like Chalky might say to Dunn (or anyone else who asked): Perfection is sometimes impossible, and maybe overrated, too."

Rodrigo Perez of IndieWire wrote, "Boardwalk Empire has a load of talented actors and writers, but them scribes sure like to take their time. We'd ask aloud if the Boardwalk staff are ever going to change their dynamic — or even consider shifting the reach for power-play paradigm with every season — but we wouldn't count on it." Chris O'Hara of TV Fanatic gave the episode a 4 star rating out of 5 and wrote, "Winter is coming to Boardwalk Empire, as Season 4 opened not in Atlantic City but in Warsaw, Indiana. If learning it was home to the second longest contiguous brick wall in the world wasn't exciting enough, we also got our first glimpse this season of Richard Harrow doing his thing. The opening scene of 'New York Sour' set the tone for the rest of the episode, which was cold and dark... but also a very entertaining start to the new year."

Michael Noble of Den of Geek wrote, "There was just so much going on that they couldn't possibly be squeezed in. A great opener that proved just what an embarrassment of riches we have to enjoy." Paste gave the episode a 7.1 out of 10 rating and wrote, "The wheels within wheels of Boardwalk Empire's massive plot machine kick off here, but it doesn't feel as big as what we saw with the opening of season one or season three."
