= All In (Boardwalk Empire) =

- Boardwalk Empire episode
- Episode no.: Season 4 Episode 4
- Directed by: Ed Bianchi
- Written by: David Matthews
- Cinematography by: Bill Coleman
- Editing by: Tim Streeto
- Original air date: September 29, 2013
- Running time: 57 minutes

Guest appearances
- Anatol Yusef as Meyer Lansky; Brian Geraghty as Agent Warren Knox; Domenick Lombardozzi as Ralph Capone; Ben Rosenfield as Willie Thompson; Erik LaRay Harvey as Dunn Purnsley; Arron Shiver as Dean O'Banion; Eric Ladin as J. Edgar Hoover; Morgan Spector as Frank Capone; Joel Marsh Garland as Stu

Episode chronology
← Previous "Acres of Diamonds"	Next → "Erlkönig"
- Boardwalk Empire (season 4)

"All In" is the fourth episode of the fourth season of the American period crime drama television series Boardwalk Empire. It is the 40th overall episode of the series and was written by David Matthews, and directed by Ed Bianchi. It was released on HBO on September 29, 2013.

The series is set in Atlantic City, New Jersey, during the Prohibition era of the 1920s. The series follows Enoch "Nucky" Thompson, a political figure who rises to prominence and interacts with mobsters, politicians, government agents, and the common folk who look up to him. In the episode, Nucky meets with Rothstein for a potential business, while Van Alden gets involved with the Capones.

According to Nielsen Media Research, the episode was seen by an estimated 1.99 million household viewers and gained a 0.8 ratings share among adults aged 18–49. The episode received extremely positive reviews from critics, who praised the performances, directing and character development.

== Plot ==
Dunn secretly meets with Narcisse in New York, now working for him in the heroin business. Despite having an argument earlier on, Narcisse agrees to take Dunn under his wing and even gets him to beat a man on his orders. Meanwhile, Eli visits Willie at Temple University and, sensing he is unhappy, tells him to toughen up. Inspired, Willie steals laxative chemicals from a classroom and spikes a drink with them during a party. A classmate who bullies Willie drinks it and embarrasses himself in front of the other students, to Willie's delight. However, by next morning, the bully has died, disturbing Willie.

In Chicago, O'Banion sends Van Alden to visit Jake Guzik in the hospital. He arrives, meeting Capone and Frank. Despite his reluctance, Van Alden is forced to accompany them to make Guzik's collections. After spending the day with him, the Capones offer a share of O'Banion's territory to Van Alden if he collaborates with them. They then steal one of O'Banion's trucks, and a reluctant Van Alden accompanies them in joyriding it. While driving, they discover a person inside the truck. The person recognizes Van Alden and the Capones kill him, to Van Alden's horror. They drop him off at his house, with Van Alden agreeing to help with their plans in the upcoming elections.

Nucky discloses his plans to use the land parcel in Florida as a new operations center. He meets with Rothstein for a possible partnership, but the latter is not interested after their previous encounter. To convince him, Nucky plays poker with Rothstein and their associates. However, he decides to leave Rothstein out of the deal after the latter exhibits a gambling problem during their game. Instead, Lansky offers to buy Rothstein's share. Nucky accepts but gives him forty-eight hours to buy the share before the offer expires. During this, Knox meets with J. Edgar Hoover to disclose information on Nucky's inner circle, intending to take them down. Knox starts his operation by arresting Eddie, who had just finished spending a night out with Ralph.

== Production ==
=== Development ===
In August 2013, HBO confirmed that the fourth episode of the season would be titled "All In", and that it would be written by David Matthews, and directed by Ed Bianchi. This was Matthews' first writing credit, and Bianchi's fourth directing credit.

== Reception ==
=== Viewers ===
In its original American broadcast, "All In" was seen by an estimated 1.99 million household viewers with a 0.8 in the 18-49 demographics. This means that 0.8 percent of all households with televisions watched the episode. This was a 6% increase in viewership from the previous episode, which was watched by 1.87 million household viewers with a 0.7 in the 18-49 demographics.

=== Critical reviews ===
"All In" received extremely positive reviews from critics. Matt Fowler of IGN gave the episode a "great" 8.7 out of 10 and wrote, "Yes, I lament the lack of Harrow and his usual beautiful poetic morbidity this week, but I think we could all tell, after last week's episode, that he was headed for a break story-wise. However, 'All In' wound up being the most wicked and perversely satisfying episode of the seasons to date."

Genevieve Valentine of The A.V. Club gave the episode a "B" grade and wrote, "This slow-motion ripple effect has made the season so far a solid study of the effects of changing roles on this community of characters, but occasionally, this focus on the minutiae becomes momentum-sapping languor. 'All In' is no different. At its best, it presents beautifully-acted central characters making small mistakes that feel suitably momentous; at its worst, it's an episode in which we see movement without drive in secondary plots that have been working to stay relevant until they actually become relevant."

Alan Sepinwall of HitFix wrote, "Ethnic pride runs especially deep in 'All In,' an episode in which black, Jewish and German members of our large ensemble express love of their heritage in different ways." Seth Colter Walls of Vulture gave the episode a 3 star rating out of 5 and wrote, "Despite not being terribly suspenseful — a lot of the events that occurred in this episode were things we expected to happen — this episode worked pretty well. It managed to move between all of the axes of action (save Florida) without feeling madly all over the place."

Rodrigo Perez of IndieWire wrote, "Boardwalk Empire had its best episode this season so far last night. While a bulk of the show was still chess-piece writing, it felt more charged and alive than usual, especially the unexpected and magnetic face off between Atlantic City’s Nucky Thompson and the Big Apple's Arnold Rothstein." Chris O'Hara of TV Fanatic gave the episode a 4.5 star rating out of 5 and wrote, "What was more evident after this episode was just how much is riding on this upcoming election. The Capone brothers talk about it as if a war is coming and perhaps there is. I hope for Van Alden's sake and his family's, he chooses sides wisely."

Michael Noble of Den of Geek wrote, "Here, Rothstein exemplifies the entire spirit of the show, as did the episode itself. All In, an expression from poker, is concerned with the nexus of work and pleasure and with showing us just how quickly the good times can go sour." Paste gave the episode an 8.1 out of 10 rating and wrote, "By finally caring about its cast rather than seeing them as just game pieces to be moved into position, 'All In' ended up the best episode of the season so far."
