= The Old Ship of Zion (Boardwalk Empire) =

- Boardwalk Empire episode
- Episode no.: Season 4 Episode 8
- Directed by: Tim Van Patten
- Written by: Christine Chambers; Howard Korder
- Cinematography by: Bill Coleman
- Editing by: Tim Streeto
- Original air date: October 27, 2013
- Running time: 58 minutes

Guest appearances
- Patricia Arquette as Sally Wheet; Brian Geraghty as Agent James Tolliver; Ben Rosenfield as Willie Thompson; Erik LaRay Harvey as Dunn Purnsley; Kevin O'Rourke as Edward L. Bader; Ty Michael Robinson as Samuel Crawford

Episode chronology
← Previous "William Wilson"	Next → "Marriage and Hunting"
- Boardwalk Empire (season 4)

"The Old Ship of Zion" is the eighth episode of the fourth season of the American period crime drama television series Boardwalk Empire. It is the 44th overall episode of the series and was written by Christine Chambers and executive producer Howard Korder, and directed by executive producer Tim Van Patten. It was released on HBO on October 27, 2013.

The series is set in Atlantic City, New Jersey, during the Prohibition era of the 1920s. The series follows Enoch "Nucky" Thompson, a political figure who rises to prominence and interacts with mobsters, politicians, government agents, and the common folk who look up to him. In the episode, Chalky finds a conspiracy in his community, while Tolliver starts investigating Willie in an attempt to take down Nucky.

According to Nielsen Media Research, the episode was seen by an estimated 1.91 million household viewers and gained a 0.8 ratings share among adults aged 18–49. The episode received extremely positive reviews from critics, praising the character development, performances and pacing.

== Plot ==
Willie starts working for Nucky, but wants to avoid any contact with Eli. Nucky receives the first shipment from Florida, and is surprised when Sally visits him. One day, Sally meets Willie and they both talk about their lives. After their conversation, Willie tells Nucky that he is leaving the Albatross and will apologize to Eli for his actions. Afterwards, Willie starts working for Edward L. Bader based on a previous encounter. Nucky, meanwhile, bids farewell to Sally as she returns to Florida.

Dunn continues getting involved in the heroin business, handing packages to a man named Moses. However, Chalky is annoyed that the city's African-American community is favoring Narcisse over him. Chalky then leads a team to raid the community in order to find the local heroin dealer. Desperate, Dunn kills Moses before he can confess anything and protect his name. Nevertheless, Chalky finds a flyer on Moses' body for an opera by Narcisse, which Dunn had previously provided to him. He confronts Narcisse in the street and burns a brick of heroin in front of the pedestrians. On Narcisse's orders, Daughter is instructed to seduce Chalky that night. During that, Dunn appears, claiming to have found the dealer. Realizing his betrayal, Chalky fights him until Daughter stabs Dunn in the back, killing him.

With very limited information, Tolliver investigates Willie, finding out about Henry's death and how Nucky visited the DA. He talks with Clayton in prison, where he gets vital information. He later confronts Eli, forcing him to become an informant or Willie could go to prison. With no option, Eli is forced to accept. He returns home, where he welcomes Willie back into the house, not disclosing his meeting with Tolliver.

== Production ==
=== Development ===
In September 2013, HBO confirmed that the eighth episode of the season would be titled "The Old Ship of Zion", and that it would be written by Christine Chambers and executive producer Howard Korder, and directed by executive producer Tim Van Patten. This was Chambers' first writing credit, Korder's 16th writing credit, and Van Patten's 15th directing credit.

== Reception ==
=== Viewers ===
In its original American broadcast, "The Old Ship of Zion" was seen by an estimated 1.91 million household viewers with a 0.8 in the 18-49 demographics. This means that 0.8 percent of all households with televisions watched the episode. This was a 12% decrease in viewership from the previous episode, which was watched by 2.16 million household viewers with a 0.8 in the 18-49 demographics.

=== Critical reviews ===
"The Old Ship of Zion" received extremely positive reviews from critics. Matt Fowler of IGN gave the episode a "great" 8.6 out of 10 and wrote, "Boardwalk Empire shook itself off this week and broke free of its minor mid-season dip with 'The Old Ship of Zion' - an episode highlighted by an intense confrontation between Chalky and Dr. Narcisse and a violent (and deadly) altercation between Chalky and Dunn."

Genevieve Valentine of The A.V. Club gave the episode an "A" grade and wrote, "One of the reasons this show has stayed so engaging is that it assembles a cast of actors that can almost universally elevate their material. And when an actor like Michael K. Williams, who's spent several seasons as a scene-stealing supporting act, finally gets room to stretch, we get 'The Old Ship of Zion,' a reminder of what this show can do at its best."

Alan Sepinwall of HitFix wrote, "Another strong outing, particularly on Chalky's side of town. As I've been saying, so far this season feels a bit more loosely-constructed than the last few, but most of the individual are really strong, and they've got several episodes left to tie together as much as they want to." Seth Colter Walls of Vulture gave the episode a 4 star rating out of 5 and wrote, "What to make of the fact that the most dramatically straightforward episode of Boardwalk Empire this season is its most satisfying one yet? There's none of the Illinois arc, nor any of New York's in this episode, while even the Floridians and DC lawmen in the Boardwalk universe do us the favor of traveling to Atlantic City at various points. But as far as individual hours of successful television go, this one was achieved though more or less traditional ends: We watched a core group of characters, unified in time and space, going through changes."

Rodrigo Perez of IndieWire wrote, "Yes, Boardwalk Empire takes a long time to coalesce, but we'll admit, when its early chess piece moves begin to fall into place, and you can see the forest for the trees on the board, boy does it get good. In tonight's absorbing episode, Nucky Thompson's latest booze shipment from Florida arrives with some unexpected cargo." Chris O'Hara of TV Fanatic gave the episode a perfect 5 star rating out of 5 and wrote, "Fans were treated to one of - if not the - most intense fight scenes in the show's history this week on 'The Old Ship of Zion'."

Michael Noble of Den of Geek wrote, "There is an explicitly performative aspect to so many of Boardwalk Empire's characters, but this week's episode demonstrated the tendency especially well, and particularly in the Chalky versus Narcisse storyline." Paste gave the episode an 8.5 out of 10 rating and wrote, "In all it led to the best episode of the season so far, an excellent hour of television that put the humanity back into a frequently cold and mechanical show. The dialogue was still stiff, but the cast felt human emotions, and they were for once given the screentime to make them plausible."
