= Erlkönig (Boardwalk Empire) =

- Boardwalk Empire episode
- Episode no.: Season 4 Episode 5
- Directed by: Tim Van Patten
- Written by: Howard Korder
- Cinematography by: David Franco
- Editing by: Kate Sanford; Eric Lorenz
- Original air date: October 6, 2013
- Running time: 59 minutes

Guest appearances
- Brian Geraghty as Agent Warren Knox; Domenick Lombardozzi as Ralph Capone; Erik LaRay Harvey as Dunn Purnsley; Ben Rosenfield as Willie Thompson; Wrenn Schmidt as Julia Sagorsky; Morgan Spector as Frank Capone

Episode chronology
← Previous "All In"	Next → "The North Star"
- Boardwalk Empire (season 4)

"Erlkönig" is the fifth episode of the fourth season of the American period crime drama television series Boardwalk Empire. It is the 41st overall episode of the series. It was written by executive producer Howard Korder and directed by executive producer Tim Van Patten. It was released on HBO on October 6, 2013.

The series is set in Atlantic City, New Jersey, during the Prohibition era of the 1920s. The series follows Enoch "Nucky" Thompson, a political figure who rises to prominence and interacts with mobsters, politicians, government agents, and the common folk who look up to him. In the episode, Eddie is pressured to reveal information about Nucky, while Van Alden assists the Capones in the Cicero elections.

According to Nielsen Media Research, the episode was seen by an estimated 2.09 million household viewers and gained a 0.8 ratings share among adults aged 18–49. In the episode, critics mostly praised the ending, performances, and character development.

== Plot ==
Nucky is contacted by Willie, who is being held in jail following the death of his classmate. He goes to Philadelphia, where Willie confesses that he took liquor from Mickey's warehouse. Nucky talks with the district attorney, who states that the victim's parents were huge benefactors, forcing Nucky to bribe him. Willie is released and returns to Temple University, where Doris later tells him that another student was arrested in the killing.

Relapsing into heroin abuse, Gillian grows more desperate in regaining custody of Tommy and is annoyed that she cannot contact Roy. She tries to seduce a judge to help her case, to no avail. With her supply running out, she contacts Dunn to get more. Despite not having the full price, Dunn decides to provide her with heroin. Later, Gillian tries to take Tommy from school, but is caught by Julia and his teachers. Despite Gillian's pleas, Tommy chooses to go with Julia. At home, Gillian is visited by Roy, who discovers her heroin addiction. She admits her nature, but Roy says he will stay with her, as he also has a dark past.

With the Cicero municipal elections underway, Capone assigns Van Alden to get back-up to a Western Electric factory to intimidate Democratic voters. Despite his attempts to maintain control, the confrontation soon descends into chaos. During the unrest, Van Alden attempts to shoot Capone when given the chance, but is seen by Frank. However, before Frank pulls out his gun, he is killed by police detectives, horrifying Capone. At the morgue, a devastated Capone swears revenge on the detectives who killed Frank.

Eddie has been taken by Knox and his partner, with the agents brutally torturing him to reveal any information on Nucky; Eddie does not reveal anything. They return later with Eddie's file, which reveals that he committed crimes in Germany, which caused him to flee and caused his sons to change their last names. When faced with possible deportation, Eddie finally admits that he met with Ralph on Nucky's orders. They release him, telling him they will continue meeting him. Eddie returns to the Albatross, where Nucky waits for him, worried about his absence. Eddie goes to his room, writes a letter and then kills himself by jumping out of a window.

== Production ==
=== Development ===
In September 2013, HBO confirmed that the fifth episode of the season would be titled "Erlkönig", and that it would be written by executive producer Howard Korder and directed by executive producer Tim Van Patten. This was Korder's 13th writing credit, and Van Patten's 14th directing credit.

== Reception ==
=== Viewers ===
In its original American broadcast, "Erlkönig" was seen by an estimated 2.09 million household viewers with a 0.8 in the 18-49 demographics. This means that 0.8 percent of all households with televisions watched the episode. This was a 5% increase in viewership from the previous episode, which 1.99 million household viewers watched with a 0.8 in the 18-49 demographics.

=== Critical reviews ===
"Erlkönig" mostly received positive reviews from critics. Matt Fowler of IGN gave the episode a "great" 8.5 out of 10 and wrote, "your overall appreciation for this week's installment, 'Erlkönig,' will depend on who, if anyone, you have chosen to invest your emotions in. No Chalky, Narcisse or Harrow (still) to speak of, yet many characters scraped the bottom this week. And none worse than Eddie, I'm afraid."

Genevieve Valentine of The A.V. Club gave the episode an "A–" grade and wrote, "Despite the number of turning points in 'Erlkönig,' this episode belonged to Eddie Kessler: it begins and ends in his empty room, the poem from which Agent Knox quotes, the moment Eddie cracks and betrays Nucky at last, gives the episode its title, and the awful internal struggle Eddie undergoes in the meantime echoes, hollow, against the decisions made by people who wield real power and think far less about it. There's a reason Eddie's room has birds in cages; it's no surprise that he jumped."

Alan Sepinwall of HitFix wrote, "I'm amazed at how much the show was able to do with Eddie in only a handful of episodes. Before last season's 'Two Imposters,' he was at best comic relief, but in that episode, he not only got shot saving Nucky's life, but Nucky realized how little he (and therefore we) knew about his manservant. This season has filled in the gaps admirably, to the point where I'm sad about Eddie's apparent suicide, even as I understand exactly why he did it." Seth Colter Walls of Vulture gave the episode a 2-star rating out of 5 and wrote, "Outside of this axis, the fourth season of Boardwalk Empire is just a little bit in trouble: We're five episodes in now, and things in Atlantic City, Washington, D.C., McCoy's Florida, and Richard Harrow's Midwest adventure seem rather scattered. That's not to say the show isn't consistently entertaining. But the shaggy-dog nature of the overall construction, outside Illinois, is beginning to show pretty plainly."

Rodrigo Perez of IndieWire wrote, "The fifth episode of the fourth season, the German word 'Erlkönig' was about as explosive as it gets for a mid-season entry. Two characters died; one was recently introduced and brimming with promise, and the other was a longtime character for whom Boardwalk fans recently grew to have tremendous affection. But the episode could have easily been titled 'Loyalty' considering how heavy the theme (and lack thereof it) hung over the proceedings." Chris O'Hara of TV Fanatic gave the episode a 4-star rating of 5 and wrote, "With Eddie lost, it will be interesting to see who Knox goes after next. We will have to wait until Sunday to see, but yet another week has come and gone with nothing more from Richard and no sign yet of Margaret."

Michael Noble of Den of Geek wrote, "With that, Erlkönig sets out the symbolism that will dominate an episode concerned with temptation and the decisions the people take when presented with two masters." Paste gave the episode a 6.3 out of 10 rating and wrote, "Like so many episodes of Boardwalk Empire, 'Erlkönig' is four distinct storylines with practically no overlap. As such, it functions kind of like an anthology film, with good parts and bad parts, but this combination is always a bit disappointing because when the suspense is ratcheting up with Van Alden, the show will cut away and show us more of Gillian wandering around, shooting up heroin. 'Erlkönig' had its moments, but the episode still felt padded."
