= Havre de Grace (Boardwalk Empire) =

- Boardwalk Empire episode
- Episode no.: Season 4 Episode 11
- Directed by: Allen Coulter
- Written by: Howard Korder
- Cinematography by: David Franco
- Editing by: Kate Sanford
- Original air date: November 17, 2013
- Running time: 58 minutes

Guest appearances
- Patricia Arquette as Sally Wheet; Louis Gossett Jr. as Oscar Boneau; Dominic Chianese as Leander Whitlock; Stephen Root as Gaston Means; Brian Geraghty as Agent James Tolliver; Ben Rosenfield as Willie Thompson; Margot Bingham as Daughter Maitland

Episode chronology
← Previous "White Horse Pike"	Next → "Farewell Daddy Blues"
- Boardwalk Empire (season 4)

"Havre de Grace" is the eleventh episode of the fourth season of the American period crime drama television series Boardwalk Empire. It is the 47th overall episode of the series and was written by executive producer Howard Korder, and directed by Allen Coulter. It was released on HBO on November 17, 2013.

The series is set in Atlantic City, New Jersey, during the Prohibition era of the 1920s. The series follows Enoch "Nucky" Thompson, a political figure who rises to prominence and interacts with mobsters, politicians, government agents, and the common folk who look up to him. In the episode, Nucky is informed about a potential "skunk in his cellar". Meanwhile, Chalky flees to his old mentor's house, while Gillian decides on her future with Roy.

According to Nielsen Media Research, the episode was seen by an estimated 1.98 million household viewers and gained a 0.7 ratings share among adults aged 18–49. The episode received mostly positive reviews from critics, who praised the storylines, performances and set-up for the finale.

== Plot ==
After the failed assassination attempt, Chalky and Daughter go to Havre de Grace, Maryland. Chalky asks Oscar Boneau for asylum, which he grants. Oscar is a blind man and needs help from many people in his house, and was also responsible for guiding Chalky in his early life. Despite that, Oscar is not adamant of Daughter and also criticizes Chalky's actions.

Gillian sells the Commodore's house in order to pay debts, but finds that the custody case may put Tommy in an orphanage. She decides to give up the case, informing Richard about it and gives him Jimmy's dog tags. While dining, Roy informs Gillian that he will leave due to a recent A&P merger and proposes to her, which she accepts. As they leave, Roy is confronted by a drunk A&P executive, Hewson, who blames Roy for losing his job. When the executive turns hostile, Roy kills him, shocking Gillian. As they question over what to do, Gillian reveals that she was involved in Roger's death and made it appear like Jimmy. Suddenly, two officers appear, with Roy revealing that he and the officers are Pinkerton agents. Leander Whitlock is revealed to have cooperated with the agents, feeling he owed the Commodore. With the confession, a devastated Gillian is arrested.

When Oscar demands that Daughter leave the house, Chalky informs her that they will both leave the following day. However, he is surprised to discover that Daughter left during the night. Eventually realizing that one of his henchmen sold them out, Oscar goes outside, where he is killed by Narcisse's men. Chalky and the rest of Oscar's henchmen kill the assailants, but lament losing Oscar.

Gaston Means calls Nucky, informing him about a "skunk in his cellar". After hanging up, Means is arrested by the United States Capitol Police for committing perjury. Tolliver pressures Eli into setting a meeting with Nucky and his associates. Eli visits Nucky at the Albatross, and convinces him into setting a meeting by saying he can trust Tolliver. The family reunion turns uncomfortable as Eli's behavior changes when he is asked about Tolliver's previous visit to their home, worrying Willie. Nucky talks with Eli, reciting an old poem that the latter made. When Eli does not react to it, Nucky tells him to set up the meeting, realizing who the "skunk" is. Nucky later calls Sally, saying he plans to retire from the criminal business.

== Production ==
=== Development ===
In October 2013, HBO confirmed that the eleventh episode of the season would be titled "Havre de Grace", and that it would be written by executive producer Howard Korder, and directed by Allen Coulter. This was Korder's 17th writing credit, and Coulter's ninth directing credit.

== Reception ==
=== Viewers ===
In its original American broadcast, "Havre de Grace" was seen by an estimated 1.98 million household viewers with a 0.7 in the 18-49 demographics. This means that 0.7 percent of all households with televisions watched the episode. This was a 5% decrease in viewership from the previous episode, which was watched by 2.08 million household viewers with a 0.8 in the 18-49 demographics.

=== Critical reviews ===
"Havre de Grace" received mostly positive reviews from critics. Matt Fowler of IGN gave the episode a "great" 8.5 out of 10 and wrote in his verdict, "'Havre de Grace' took a big risk by simmering things down and introducing us to a whole new world from Chalky's past, but it serves nicely as a calm before an inevitable storm. For a show that does a lot of calms before a lot of storms."

Genevieve Valentine of The A.V. Club gave the episode a "B+" grade and wrote, "This week is just a series of timely reminders, as characters are calmly and calculatedly betrayed, making for a relatively quiet but haunting penultimate episode that unfolds like the long sigh just before stepping out into the line of fire. And it's no coincidence that 'Havre de Grace' features several shots of characters on porches or balconies or beside windows, looking out at avenues of escape they can’t quite reach."

Alan Sepinwall of HitFix wrote, "After the blazing guns and deal making of 'White Horse Pike,' 'Havre de Grace' was a more muted hour as the calm before a presumed storm in the finale. No Chicago or New York this week, and only the briefest of glimpses of Washington and Tampa. The show's narrative sprawl is often very effective, but it's also nice to get an hour like this essentially focusing on three stories, especially when the one providing the episode's title provides such insight into the background of Chalky." Seth Colter Walls of Vulture gave the episode a 4 star rating out of 5 and wrote, "Boardwalk Empire sometimes toggles back and forth between states of being quite obvious, and then very obscure. But the show is at its best when it figures out an artful way to mix these two paints, as it mostly does here, in the next-to-last-episode of the fourth season."

Rodrigo Perez of IndieWire wrote, "Where the prior episode was electrically charged and nerve-wracking, 'Havre De Grace' is moody and menacing — a foreboding pall of portent thick in the night sky." Chris O'Hara of TV Fanatic gave the episode a perfect 5 star rating out of 5 and wrote, "After this latest deception at Oscar's, it is going to be that much harder for Chalky to believe Nucky when he tries to tell Chalky that he had nothing to do with the attempted ambush by Mayor Bader's men. One episode left and it promises to be a big one."

Michael Noble of Den of Geek wrote, "It's done so largely through demonstrating its embarrassment of riches. The single-episode appearance of Louis Gossett Jr. is a case in point. In what was essentially a cameo, he offered a richly characterised performance, full of tiny gestures and behavioural tics, held together by a brilliantly earthy vocal delivery that perfectly captured the weary, aching Oscar and his almost-too-tired desire to save Chalky once more, this time from himself." Paste gave the episode a 6.1 out of 10 rating and wrote, "The network, the system between them, is what's important, as Knox seems to understand even when the show's writers don’t. The part of 'Havre' that had that link with everything else in the show, the tangle between the Thompsons and Knox and the rest of the nation’s criminal empire, was good entertainment. The rest of the episode, which went down to the level of the personal, was trite and dull."
