= Marriage and Hunting =

- Boardwalk Empire episode
- Episode no.: Season 4 Episode 9
- Directed by: Ed Bianchi
- Written by: David Matthews; Jennifer Ames; Steve Turner
- Cinematography by: David Franco
- Editing by: Kate Sanford
- Original air date: November 3, 2013
- Running time: 56 minutes

Guest appearances
- Patricia Arquette as Sally Wheet; Domenick Lombardozzi as Ralph Capone; Wrenn Schmidt as Julia Sagorsky; Arron Shiver as Dean O'Banion; Fredric Lehne as Owney Madden; Ty Michael Robinson as Samuel Crawford

Episode chronology
← Previous "The Old Ship of Zion"	Next → "White Horse Pike"
- Boardwalk Empire (season 4)

"Marriage and Hunting" is the ninth episode of the fourth season of the American period crime drama television series Boardwalk Empire. It is the 45th overall episode of the series and was written by David Matthews, Jennifer Ames, and Steve Turner, and directed by Ed Bianchi. It was released on HBO on November 3, 2013.

The series is set in Atlantic City, New Jersey, during the Prohibition era of the 1920s. The series follows Enoch "Nucky" Thompson, a political figure who rises to prominence and interacts with mobsters, politicians, government agents, and the common folk who look up to him. In the episode, Chalky wants vengeance for Narcisse's involvement in his assassination attempt, while Van Alden faces pressure in Chicago.

According to Nielsen Media Research, the episode was seen by an estimated 1.90 million household viewers and gained a 0.8 ratings share among adults aged 18–49. The episode received extremely positive reviews from critics, who praised the writing, performances and production values.

== Plot ==
Chalky informs Nucky about Dunn's role in his assassination attempt. He wants retribution against Narcisse but Nucky talks him out of it, not wanting to lose the Onyx Club in another gang war. During dinner, Chalky's daughter, Maybelle, receives a phone call from the club, informing Chalky that Narcisse beat Daughter for her failure. Chalky visits Daughter at her house to tend to Daughter, assigning a henchman to watch over her. He goes to the club intending to attack Narcisse, but Nucky warns him to not start a war. He visits Daughter again, but their encounter is cut short when Maybelle visits. Aware of his affair, she leaves the scene.

Rothstein falls further into a financial hole. He still holds a $500,000 life insurance policy on Mickey Doyle that Mickey willingly signed years earlier. He informs Nucky of this and they negotiate. With Rothstein admitting his desperation, Nucky agrees to buy the policy on Doyle's life from Rothstein for 20 cents on the dollar in exchange for Rothstein sparing Doyle's life.

In Chicago, Van Alden feels humiliated when Sigrid questions his virility. He goes on a delivery, which turns out to be for Capone and Ralph. They are angry with his lack of information but are willing to pay him $1,000 to kill O'Banion. However, Van Alden is intercepted by his former colleagues from Farraday Electric, who punch him for their previous encounter. Reaching his breaking point, Van Alden kills them all. That night, while being held at gun point and still fed up over being constantly threatened, Van Alden finally opens up about his past to O'Banion, intending to kill him. Before he can do so, O'Banion is killed by Frankie Yale, John Scalise and Albert Anselmi. Van Alden robs the shop and then takes the body to get the money. More confident, he returns home and has sex with Sigrid.

While on the beach, Gillian tells Roy about her past, explaining how the Commodore raped her as a child and named Jimmy after the first boy she kissed. They attend a court hearing to discuss Tommy's custody. The judge notes that Julia and Paul's salaries are not enough for Tommy's life, especially when Julia is not married. He states he will come to a conclusion within one month. As the judge will favor a married couple, Julia proposes to Richard, who accepts. To financially support them, Richard approaches Nucky to ask for a job. That night, Roy is seen making a phone call to someone, explaining he will take care of something. Nucky calls Sally, suggesting he could go again to Florida.

== Production ==
=== Development ===
In October 2013, HBO confirmed that the ninth episode of the season would be titled "Marriage and Hunting", and that it would be written by David Matthews, Jennifer Ames, and Steve Turner, and directed by Ed Bianchi. This was Matthews' third writing credit, Ames' first writing credit, Turner's first writing credit, and Bianchi's fifth directing credit.

== Reception ==
=== Viewers ===
In its original American broadcast, "Marriage and Hunting" was seen by an estimated 1.90 million household viewers with a 0.8 in the 18-49 demographics. This means that 0.8 percent of all households with televisions watched the episode. This was a slight decrease in viewership from the previous episode, which was watched by 1.91 million household viewers with a 0.8 in the 18-49 demographics.

=== Critical reviews ===
"Marriage and Hunting" received extremely positive reviews from critics. Matt Fowler of IGN gave the episode a "great" 8.8 out of 10 and wrote, "Although 'Marriage and Hunting' acted as sort of a bridge episode with regards to Chalky and Dr. Narcisse's deadly feud, the connective tissue present here was great, and the demented duality of Van Alden was flat-out mesmerizing."

Genevieve Valentine of The A.V. Club gave the episode an "A–" grade and wrote, "'Marriage and Hunting' operates in much the same way as an hour of television; this is an episode that doesn't quite explode, but we're close enough to season's end that there's a coil of energy through it that’s heating up."

Alan Sepinwall of HitFix wrote, "It's a tough hour full of angry men doing self-destructive things, and you can understand why, by the end of it, Nucky might be so damn tired of it all that he just wants to run away and hang out with Sally in the wilds of Tampa." Seth Colter Walls of Vulture gave the episode a 3 star rating out of 5 and wrote, "It's a B-story-packed episode of Boardwalk Empire, in which we connect with old friends like Nelson Van Alden, the Capones, and Gillian. But there's a thematic conceit that helps connect a lot of the subplot track-jumping. In a couple different time zones, characters seem tired of their secrets. And it's cool to see that some of these less regularly attended to narrative arcs are capable of proving resonant with respect to the show's deep history, especially compared with last week's long-telegraphed Chalky-Dunn finale."

Rodrigo Perez of IndieWire wrote, "In the blink of an eye, fortunes change. One week you’re up, the next week you're down. It's strange to see a seemingly unassailable man like Arnold Rothstein down on his luck, but that's exactly where we find the Manhattan gangster in this episode. It's perhaps a shock just to hear through dialogue that Rothstein’s empire is crumbling, but the writing has been on the wall for a few months now, especially as revealed in 'All In,' the episode where the gambler lost his shirt in one of Nucky Thompson's Atlantic City clubs." Chris O'Hara of TV Fanatic gave the episode a perfect 5 star rating out of 5 and wrote, "Even if Nucky takes a hiatus in Florida, Knox's ultimatum to Eli still remains. Though there is little he can do to protect himself from his brother's potential betrayal while it remains a secret to him, I hope for his sake he takes Richard with him to Florida to watch his back down there."

Michael Noble of Den of Geek wrote, "It is taking these events and creating a powerful thematic argument. It is, if you'll forgive the dry theoretical language, a kind of 'gestalt narrative', in which the parts are unremarkable until they are viewed as part of the whole. This is not easy to pull off. Very few shows can do it, fewer still do it well but it’s for this reason, above all else that Boardwalk Empire deserves to be ranked in the uppermost tier of modern American television." Paste gave the episode an 8.5 out of 10 rating and wrote, "'Marriage and Hunting' was a less focused episode than last week's, to its detriment, but the sprawl for once felt purposeful."
