= Farewell Daddy Blues =

- Boardwalk Empire episode
- Episode no.: Season 4 Episode 12
- Directed by: Tim Van Patten
- Written by: Terence Winter; Howard Korder
- Cinematography by: Bill Coleman
- Editing by: Tim Streeto
- Original air date: November 24, 2013
- Running time: 56 minutes

Guest appearances
- Patricia Arquette as Sally Wheet; Dominic Chianese as Leander Whitlock; Brian Geraghty as Agent James Tolliver; Domenick Lombardozzi as Ralph Capone; Ben Rosenfield as Willie Thompson; Wrenn Schmidt as Julia Sagorsky; Eric Ladin as J. Edgar Hoover; Greg Antonacci as Johnny Torrio; Margot Bingham as Daughter Maitland; Kevin O'Rourke as Edward L. Bader; Tim Ransom as Victor Drake; Katherine Waterston as Emma Harrow

Episode chronology
← Previous "Havre de Grace"	Next → "Golden Days for Boys and Girls"
- Boardwalk Empire (season 4)

"Farewell Daddy Blues" is the twelfth episode and season finale of the fourth season of the American period crime drama television series Boardwalk Empire. It is the 48th overall episode of the series and was written by series creator Terence Winter and executive producer Howard Korder, and directed by executive producer Tim Van Patten. It was released on HBO on November 24, 2013.

The series is set in Atlantic City, New Jersey, during the Prohibition era of the 1920s. The series follows Enoch "Nucky" Thompson, a political figure who rises to prominence and interacts with mobsters, politicians, government agents, and the common folk who look up to him. In the episode, Nucky seeks to stop the conflict between Chalky and Narcisse, while Eli faces pressure from Tolliver in delivering more information.

According to Nielsen Media Research, the episode was seen by an estimated 2.18 million household viewers and gained a 0.7 ratings share among adults aged 18–49. The episode received critical acclaim, with critics praising the episode's bittersweet tone, performances and production values. At the 66th Primetime Emmy Awards, Tim Van Patten received a nomination for Outstanding Directing for a Drama Series.

== Plot ==
An angry Chalky sneaks into the Albatross with his gang to confront Nucky over his partnership with Narcisse. Nucky states he wants to kill Narcisse as well. For this, Nucky talks with Narcisse over meeting with Chalky and settling the ownership of the Onyx Club.

During Gillian's trial, Richard is brought to testify. He claims that Gillian made Roger's body appear like Jimmy's, but the defense claims that Richard's disability prevents him from identifying. To support it, Richard asks Nucky to know Jimmy's location so he can use it as evidence. Nucky accepts to inform authorities with a favor from Richard, for which he will have to perform a hit. Richard then bids farewell to Julia, Paul and Tommy, sending them to live with Emma, promising to meet them there in a few days.

In Chicago, Van Alden suspects that Torrio orchestrated the hit on Capone's life. Later, Torrio is gunned down outside his house but survives. At the hospital, he announces his retirement and appoints Capone as the new boss, intending to move back to Italy.

Eli meets with Nucky at the Albatross, only to be held at gunpoint by Nucky. Nucky reveals his knowledge of his informant status and demands answers. Eli confesses that he was forced to inform Tolliver about Nucky's operation, revealing he works for the Bureau. Willie walks in on the confrontation, and Eli proclaims that he did it to protect Willie from prison. Willie flees and Eli goes to the house, only to be confronted by Tolliver. Tolliver attempts to arrest Eli, but infuriates Eli by stating his intention to arrest Willie, implying he will be raped in prison. Enraged at this threat to his son, Eli throws a punch. The two men get into a violent fight in the living room, which culminates in Eli beating Tolliver to death as June and the rest of his children scream from upstairs in terror.

Chalky meets with Narcisse at the Onyx, with Narcisse revealing that he has Maybelle hostage and wants Daughter back if he wants her released. During the meeting, Richard aims a rifle at Narcisse from afar, but he hesitates when he gets Narcisse at the spot. He then fires, but Maybelle has already moved in front of Narcisse, dying and shocking both Richard and Chalky. A gunfight ensues and Richard is wounded, forcing him to flee the club. Chalky also escapes, but Narcisse is arrested when authorities arrive at the club in search of Eli. Making his way to the boardwalk, Richard rests under the pier.

Hoover meets with Narcisse in jail. To his surprise, he offers a deal; Narcisse will reveal details surrounding Marcus Garvey and be released, or face prison time for Tolliver's murder. Nucky is also stopped short from leaving to Florida when authorities question him over Eli's whereabouts. Eli's family moves out of town and Nucky instructs Willie that he must take care of his family now, telling them that Eli is safe. Eli is revealed to be arriving in Chicago, where he meets Van Alden. Gillian is informed in prison about Jimmy's body's discovery, devastating her as she has lost everything. Margaret is introduced to her new home by Rothstein. Chalky flees back to Oscar's house in Havre de Grace, Maryland, having lost the Onyx Club, his family, and his standing in the community, while also devastated over Maybelle's death.

Richard boards a train and then walks up to Emma's farm house, where he reunites with Julia, Paul, Tommy, Emma and her husband. As Julia approaches him, Richard's mask disappears, revealing the event to be a fantasy. Back at the pier, Richard's mask has fallen off and Richard has died peacefully from his wounds.

== Production ==
=== Development ===
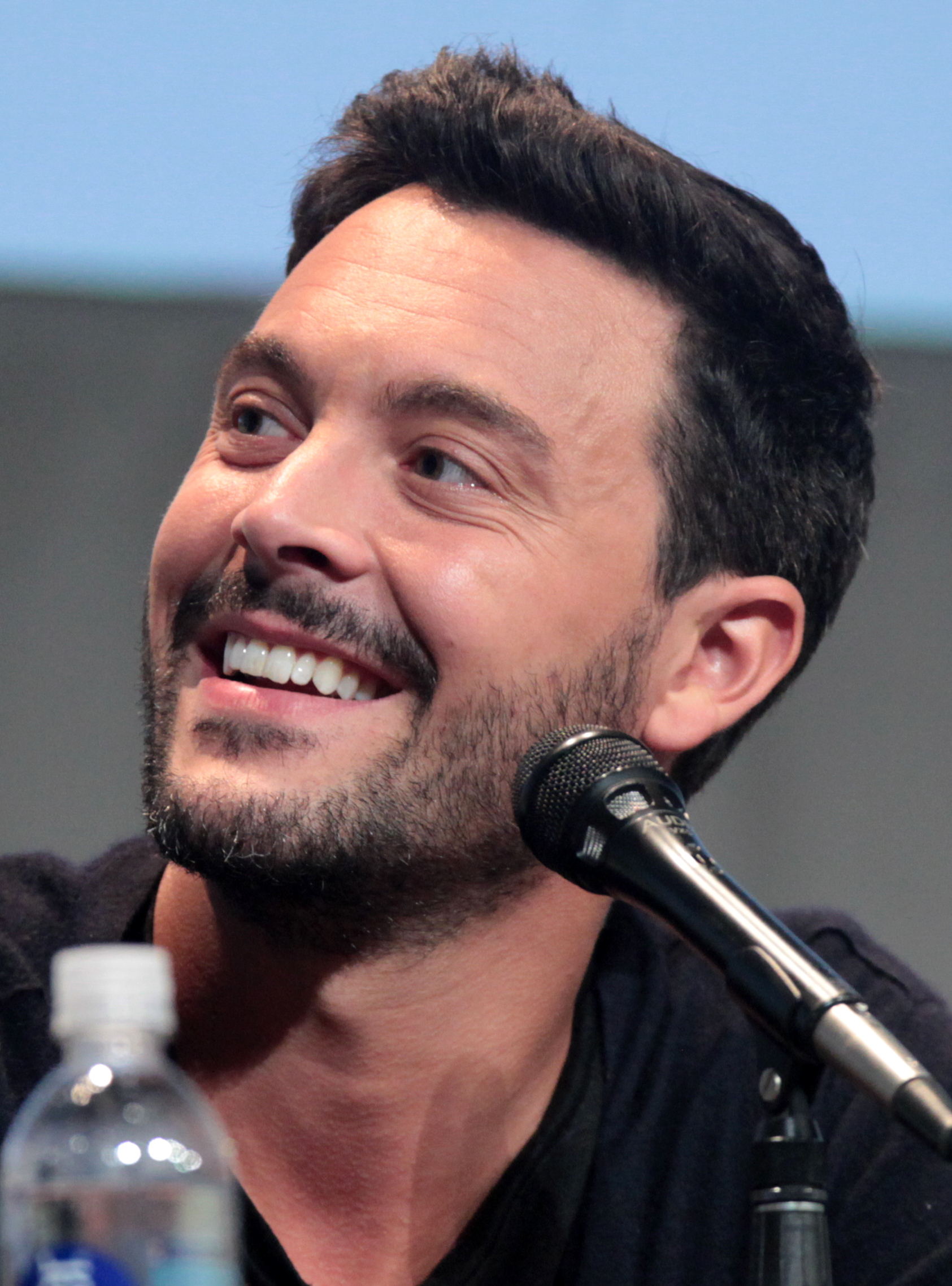
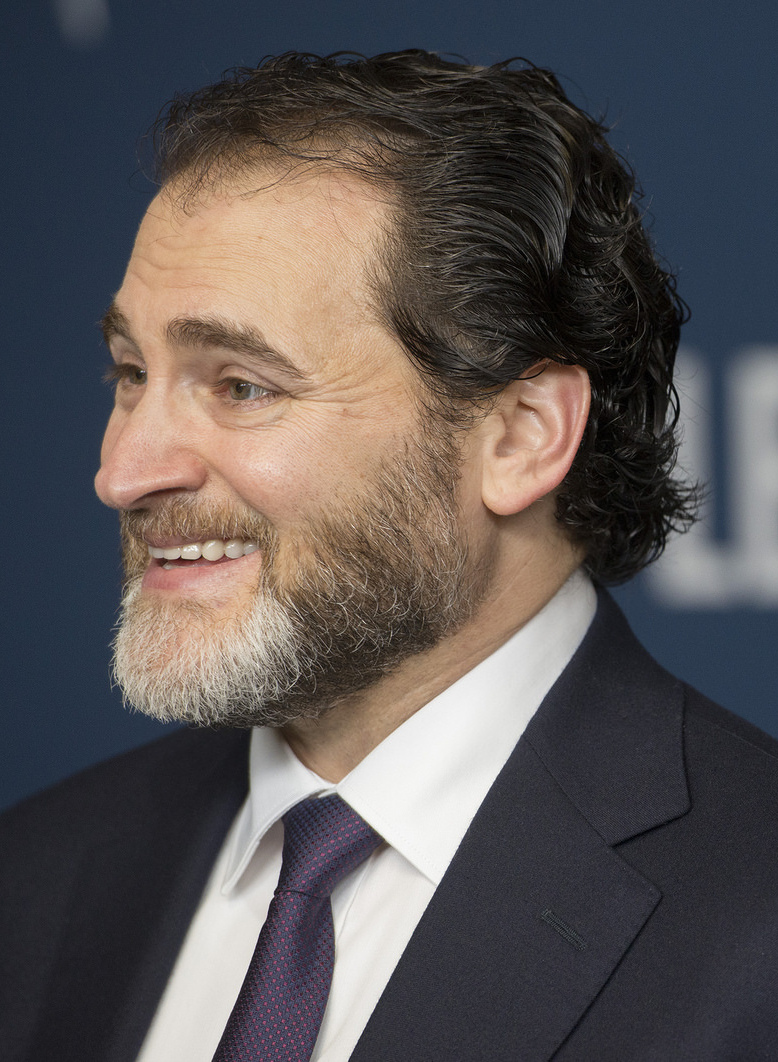
The episode marked Jack Huston and Michael Stuhlbarg's final appearances in the series.

In October 2013, HBO confirmed that the twelfth and final episode of the season would be titled "Farewell Daddy Blues", and that it would be written by series creator Terence Winter and executive producer Howard Korder, and directed by executive producer Tim Van Patten. This was Winter's 12th writing credit, Korder's 18th writing credit, and Van Patten's 16th directing credit.

=== Writing ===
Terence Winter felt that Richard's death "brought him full circle." He further added that the writers couldn't continue bringing out of retirement get back in the main storyline, saying "as it played out it just made the most sense dramatically to bring him to a conclusion in that way." He commented that while the writers considered having him return to his family, "it just felt a little too nicely wrapped up and neat. This felt like a much more realistic, dramatic way to go and tell that story." He compared it to Oscar's warning to Chalky in the previous episode, "As Oscar tells to Chalky, eventually we all run out of road, and we knew at some point, Richard was going to run out of road." Jack Huston stated that he favored the decision as he did not want Richard to repeat the same actions as previous seasons, explaining, "If he was going to die, they wanted him to die when people still loved him – not when he was just another character."

Winter wanted to avoid having the antagonists die or wrap their storylines with the finale, in contrast to previous season finales, which is why the writers kept Narcisse alive. He said, "It actually worked in our favor anyway, so we didn't feel the need to kill him, or wrap it up in any more of a conclusive way than it was handled."

Commenting on Eli's new role in Chicago, Winter said, "in terms of the story, we are always trying to be surprising and do something different than what the audience expects as long as it falls within the framework of the reality of the show. I really try not to do things that feel like TV, or the TV version of something."

As the fifth season's storyline is set seven years after the conclusion of the episode, the episode also marked the final appearance of Michael Stuhlbarg as Arnold Rothstein.

== Reception ==
=== Viewers ===
In its original American broadcast, "Farewell Daddy Blues" was seen by an estimated 2.18 million household viewers with a 0.7 in the 18-49 demographics. This means that 0.7 percent of all households with televisions watched the episode. This was a 10% increase in viewership from the previous episode, which was watched by 1.98 million household viewers with a 0.7 in the 18-49 demographics.

=== Critical reviews ===
"Farewell Daddy Blues" received critical acclaim. Matt Fowler of IGN gave the episode an "amazing" 9 out of 10 and wrote in his verdict, "'Farewell Daddy Blues' wasn't perfect, but it did dole out the appropriate amount of surprise and pain that we've come to expect from our Boardwalk finales. And even though I know that Harrow's story had run out, as it was tethered to Gillian's fate, I have mixed feelings about losing a fan-favorite character on a show without a lot of fan-favorite characters. Still - an hour full of tense, explosive, moments."

Genevieve Valentine of The A.V. Club gave the episode an "A–" grade and wrote, "This season has been, at times, even more deliberate than usual, but the writers pulled out all the stops for the finale; it knotted together most of the arcs of this season in a few wrenching strokes."

Alan Sepinwall of HitFix wrote, "Thanks in large part to the Chalky/Narcisse war, this was an incredibly satisfying season of Boardwalk Empire. But I think of where we left things and it makes me even more excited to speculate about next season than I feel pondering the one just finished." Seth Colter Walls of Vulture gave the episode a perfect 5 star rating out of 5 and wrote, "even if this sucks a bit of 'oh wow,' resolution-style drama from the fourth season's finale, I think the choice is a good one for this show — which has often, in a headlong rush to slam-bang climaxes, pushed beloved characters onto obvious dead-end paths."

Rodrigo Perez of IndieWire wrote, "'Farewell Daddy Blues', the final episode of season four of Boardwalk Empire, is gripping and absorbing as is par for the course in the final episodes of this mob drama series, but also tragic and heartbreaking in ways you might not have imagined." Chris O'Hara of TV Fanatic gave the episode a 4 star rating out of 5 and wrote, "As the tide went out on another season of Boardwalk Empire, fans watched the light in Richard's eye fade as well. Richard's death on 'Farewell Daddy Blues' was just one of several such departures in what was a seriously blood soaked finale."

Michael Noble of Den of Geek wrote, "Boardwalk Empire is serious enough in its intent and effective enough in its execution that it deserves to be questioned on its core assumptions. That it can answer them is testament to the talents of Terence Winter and his team. It is, in terms of quality alone, a show of the first rank." Paste gave the episode an 8.2 out of 10 rating and wrote, "Boardwalk Empire always features plenty of violence, but most of the time it's rendered as the sort of abstract, action-movie violence in which no one of consequence is injured. Here, though, no one came out unscathed. Unlike in previous seasons, the violence offered no catharsis, and for all its other flaws, that's what made 'Farewell Daddy Blues' an excellent season finale."

=== Accolades ===
For the episode, Tim Van Patten was nominated for Outstanding Directing for a Drama Series at the 66th Primetime Emmy Awards. He would lose to True Detective for the episode "Who Goes There".
