= Al Capone (disambiguation) =

Al Capone (1899–1947) was an American gangster.

Al Capone may also refer to:

- Al Capone (film), a 1959 biographical film
- "Al Capone" (song), a 1964 song by Prince Buster
- "Al Capone", a song by Michael Jackson from the 2012 album Bad 25
- "Al Kapone", a song by Riblja Čorba from the 1990 album Koza nostra
- Al Capone, a board game predecessor to Alhambra

== See also ==
- Al Kapone, American rapper
- Al Capone II (1988–2020), a steeplechaser horse
- Dennis Alcapone, Jamaican reggae musician
- Capone (disambiguation)
