= White Horse Pike (Boardwalk Empire) =

- Boardwalk Empire episode
- Episode no.: Season 4 Episode 10
- Directed by: Jake Paltrow
- Written by: Dave Flebotte
- Cinematography by: Bill Coleman
- Editing by: Tim Streeto
- Original air date: November 10, 2013
- Running time: 53 minutes

Guest appearances
- Patricia Arquette as Sally Wheet; Anatol Yusef as Meyer Lansky; Brian Geraghty as Agent James Tolliver; Domenick Lombardozzi as Ralph Capone; Ben Rosenfield as Willie Thompson; Chris Caldovino as Tonino Sandrelli; Ivo Nandi as Joe Masseria; Greg Antonacci as Johnny Torrio; Kevin O'Rourke as Edward L. Bader; Eric Ladin as J. Edgar Hoover; Patch Darragh as Robert Bennett III; Vincenzo Amato as Vincenzo Petrucelli

Episode chronology
← Previous "Marriage and Hunting"	Next → "Havre de Grace"
- Boardwalk Empire (season 4)

"White Horse Pike" is the tenth episode of the fourth season of the American period crime drama television series Boardwalk Empire. It is the 46th overall episode of the series and was written by Dave Flebotte, and directed by Jake Paltrow. It was released on HBO on November 10, 2013.

The series is set in Atlantic City, New Jersey, during the Prohibition era of the 1920s. The series follows Enoch "Nucky" Thompson, a political figure who rises to prominence and interacts with mobsters, politicians, government agents, and the common folk who look up to him. In the episode, Chalky performs a hit on Narcisse, while Nucky faces problems when heroin is smuggled in his Florida shipment.

According to Nielsen Media Research, the episode was seen by an estimated 2.08 million household viewers and gained a 0.8 ratings share among adults aged 18–49. The episode received critical acclaim, with critics praising the writing, directing, performances and pacing.

== Plot ==
In Tampa, Florida, Sally receives a liquor shipment. However, she notices that Petrucelli, Luciano and Lansky have smuggled heroin inside the shipment. She informs Nucky about the discovery. An angry Nucky interrogates Lansky at gun point for his actions and forces him to bring Masseria to Atlantic City.

Eli is pressured by Tolliver for information, so he gives up a name in Torrio's crew. However, Tolliver visits him at home, angry that he supplied them with a useless fact as the man was dead for years. Eli is then assigned by Nucky to stop a shipment on the White Horse Pike, with Tolliver tagging along. Tolliver kills one of the men and finds the heroin. He delivers his discoveries to Hoover, who is more focused on investigating Marcus Garvey.

Chalky enlists the staff at the Onyx Club to launch an attack on Narcisse in response to Dunn's failed attempt on his life. That night, Chalky and his crew shoot at Narcisse's office, killing many of his men. However, Narcisse survives and shoots Chalky in the shoulder, forcing him to flee. Chalky hides in an American Legion building with Richard's help, and Nucky hides this from Narcisse. Nucky then meets with Masseria, who reveals that he is associated with Narcisse in the heroin business when Narcisse suddenly joins them for the meeting. Once again denying knowledge of Chalky's location to Narcisse, he strikes a deal to get in the business with Masseria.

In New York City, Margaret faces eviction as her salary does not cover the expenses. Rothstein offers to grant her a better apartment for a cheaper price in exchange for some tips in his investment, which could cost her job. This prompts Margaret to demand better arrangements, which Rothstein accepts.

In Chicago, Torrio finds that Capone has placed Van Alden in his inner circle for "killing" Dean O'Banion, and reiterates that he will not leave business yet despite Capone's insistence. During a party, shortly after Torrio leaves, Capone is called by a person who wants to say goodbye. Suddenly, mobsters in a building across the street pull out machine guns and start shooting at the place, but Capone is saved by Van Alden when he pushes him to the floor.

Nucky gets Bader to sneak Chalky out of Atlantic City with Daughter. However, he discovers from Willie that Bader is working with Narcisse. The officers transporting Chalky try to kill him but he manages to kill them instead. At the Onyx Club, Maybelle meets Narcisse, who hides his identity and comforts her after she mentions that her wedding has been called off. Nucky and Eli meet at the Albatross, explaining Bader's role. Eli is dismayed to find that Willie is getting involved in the conflict, but Willie states that he is taking part in the family business, which Eli accepts.

== Production ==
=== Development ===
In October 2013, HBO confirmed that the tenth episode of the season would be titled "White Horse Pike", and that it would be written by Dave Flebotte, and directed by Jake Paltrow. This was Flebotte's third writing credit, and Paltrow's first directing credit.

== Reception ==
=== Viewers ===
In its original American broadcast, "White Horse Pike" was seen by an estimated 2.08 million household viewers with a 0.8 in the 18-49 demographics. This means that 0.8 percent of all households with televisions watched the episode. This was a 9% increase in viewership from the previous episode, which was watched by 1.90 million household viewers with a 0.8 in the 18-49 demographics.

=== Critical reviews ===
"White Horse Pike" received critical acclaim. Matt Fowler of IGN gave the episode an "amazing" 9 out of 10 and wrote in his verdict, "Things got insanely tense during 'White Horse Pike' after Chalky brought the battle to Narcisse, taking a bullet in the process. With only two episodes left in the season, this was the gateway to the endgame."

Genevieve Valentine of The A.V. Club gave the episode an "A–" grade and wrote, "This episode builds on the un-fired guns of last week with a sense of an unsettling 'almost' that haunts the many turns in this episode; everywhere you look people almost die, almost help each other, and almost connect."

Alan Sepinwall of HitFix wrote, "what drives the series, and makes episodes like this one so satisfying, are those moments before the guns come out, when deals are being cut, alliances are being formed, and very smart men have to decide whether the offer on the table is better than the arrangement they already have – and, just as importantly, whether the offer is real at all." Seth Colter Walls of Vulture gave the episode a 4 star rating out of 5 and wrote, "You didn't really think Boardwalk Empire was going to kill off Chalky White, did you? So soon after they did away with Dunn Purnsley? The fans would have gone mad. But give everyone involved some credit: This antepenultimate episode of the season felt full of danger and risk, even for Chalky. And the show managed to build up a head of steam."

Rodrigo Perez of IndieWire wrote, "one of the best episodes in the show’s history thus far, and with three two more episodes to go, it's only going to get gnarlier, nastier, and more engrossing." Chris O'Hara of TV Fanatic gave the episode a 4 star rating out of 5 and wrote, "Van Alden will play into whatever transpires with Al it seems, while the same could be said for Richard with Chalky after we saw the respect Chalky paid him in the alley and how Richard tended to his gunshot wound."

Michael Noble of Den of Geek wrote, "Seeing these characters before they attained the notoriety that still attends them has been one of the biggest appeals of Boardwalk Empire since the beginning. It is, however, more than simply an unofficial prequel to The Untouchables. Their respective ascents of the criminal ladder, interesting though they are, are given additional depth and context by the sense of generational change." Paste gave the episode a 6.8 out of 10 rating and wrote, "'White Horse Pike' felt more concerned about moving its pieces around than with character choices, so despite the non-stop action, it didn't have nearly as much excitement."
