= Capone (disambiguation) =

Al Capone (1899–1947) was an American gangster during the 1920s and 1930s.

Capone may also refer to:

- Capone (surname), a surname
- Capone (1975 film)
- Capone (2020 film)
- Capone (footballer) (born 1972), a Brazilian footballer
- Capone (rapper) (born 1976), a member of the rap duo Capone-N-Noreaga

== See also ==
- Caponians, a fictional alien race from Zak McKracken and the Alien Mindbenders
- K.Pone.Inc, record label
- Kpone, Kpone Katamanso District, Ghana
