= The North Star (Boardwalk Empire) =

- Boardwalk Empire episode
- Episode no.: Season 4 Episode 6
- Directed by: Allen Coulter
- Written by: Eric Overmyer; Howard Korder
- Cinematography by: Bill Coleman
- Editing by: Tim Streeto
- Original air date: October 13, 2013
- Running time: 58 minutes

Guest appearances
- Patricia Arquette as Sally Wheet; Anatol Yusef as Meyer Lansky; Brian Geraghty as Agent Warren Knox; Eric Ladin as J. Edgar Hoover; Wrenn Schmidt as Julia Sagorsky; Vincenzo Amato as Vincenzo Petrucelli; Ty Michael Robinson as Samuel Crawford

Episode chronology
← Previous "Erlkönig"	Next → "William Wilson"
- Boardwalk Empire (season 4)

"The North Star" is the sixth episode of the fourth season of the American period crime drama television series Boardwalk Empire. It is the 42nd overall episode of the series and was written by Eric Overmyer and executive producer Howard Korder, and directed by Allen Coulter. It was released on HBO on October 13, 2013.

The series is set in Atlantic City, New Jersey, during the Prohibition era of the 1920s. The series follows Enoch "Nucky" Thompson, a political figure who rises to prominence and interacts with mobsters, politicians, government agents, and the common folk who look up to him. In the episode, Nucky leaves for Florida to finish the land deal, while Richard decides to return with Julia.

According to Nielsen Media Research, the episode was seen by an estimated 1.90 million household viewers and gained a 0.7 ratings share among adults aged 18–49. The episode received positive reviews from critics, who praised the performances and directing, but criticizing the pacing.

== Plot ==
Before leaving for Florida, Nucky goes to Penn Station, where he meets with Margaret. Distraught over Eddie's death, he gives her a birthday gift for Teddy. Nevertheless, Margaret tells him that she is doing fine and he should not get her involved in his business.

Knox is chastised by J. Edgar Hoover for his operation, as it resulted in Eddie's death. Hoover is also worried that Eddie revealed Knox's involvement and wants to end the investigation, but Knox convinces him that it must continue. Eli and Mickey investigate Eddie's death, discovering his key for the safety-deposit box at the bank. Eli decides to go to the bank and pretend to be Eddie, but is recognized by the manager. When Knox visits and asks about Eddie's death, Eli has him empty Eddie's safety-deposit box. He then has Knox read Eddie's letter, written in German, revealing that he was happy at becoming a grandfather.

Paul visits a doctor, where he is diagnosed with cirrhosis and given just one year to live. He then talks with Richard about his condition. Richard feels uneasy about Paul's view of him, as he killed many people, but Paul opens up about his actions in the Philippine–American War, confessing that he killed a Filipino girl. Later, Richard returns to Julia's house, to Tommy's delight. Even though Julia admits she isn't sure if she can trust him, she wants him to stay.

In Florida, Nucky, Luciano and Lansky meet with McCoy, unaware that he killed Tucker. Due to Tucker's "disappearance", they still need another person involved in the project. McCoy introduces them to Vincenzo Petrucelli, Tucker's replacement. However, Petrucelli informs Luciano that he is Masseria's cousin and suggests they could contact him about getting involved. In private, Luciano tells Lansky that they should kill Petrucelli, but Lansky rebuffs it. As Lansky won't back down from his share, Luciano decides to quit and leaves. Nucky reconnects with Sally at the speakeasy and they both get drunk while discussing their problems. Their encounter soon turns into a fight, after which they have sex. Motivated, Nucky puts her in charge of his share in Florida as he accepts Petrucelli's terms and Lansky's involvement.

At the Onyx Club, Chalky continues spending time with Daughter, although he is not happy when she wants to change her musical numbers, as he wants her to maintain consistency. During a performance, Daughter performs a different song, which actually surprises Chalky. Daughter visits Chalky at his office, who claims he is upset about her deviated performance. When she mentions she is aware of his interest on her, they kiss and have sex.

== Production ==
=== Development ===
In September 2013, HBO confirmed that the sixth episode of the season would be titled "The North Star", and that it would be written by Eric Overmyer and executive producer Howard Korder, and directed by Allen Coulter. This was Overmyer's first writing credit, Korder's 15th writing credit, and Coulter's eighth directing credit.

== Reception ==
=== Viewers ===
In its original American broadcast, "The North Star" was seen by an estimated 1.90 million household viewers with a 0.7 in the 18-49 demographics. This means that 0.7 percent of all households with televisions watched the episode. This was a 10% decrease in viewership from the previous episode, which was watched by 2.09 million household viewers with a 0.8 in the 18-49 demographics.

=== Critical reviews ===
"The North Star" received positive reviews from critics. Matt Fowler of IGN gave the episode a "good" 7.7 out of 10 and wrote, "'The North Star' was definitely a seasonal lull - a pause in the action. But an ill-timed one since I still feel like this season needs to keep the momentum going. With no strong antagonist to oil the engine, things need to move along with more assuredness than in previous seasons. In fact, a part of me feels like the biggest moments of this season will come right at the end, possibly with even some sort of cliffhanger like Nucky getting arrested."

Genevieve Valentine of The A.V. Club gave the episode a "B+" grade and wrote, "This week moves a lot of pieces forward on the board; maybe because of this, it misses some of the tight interconnectedness that helped give last week its punch. But it's a study in what gets shown and what's obscured, both from the characters and from us."

Alan Sepinwall of HitFix wrote, "'The North Star' not only put Nucky back at the forefront, but did so while exercising the series' trademark patience and artistry. What's so impressive about this episode, and the best hours of the show, is how they let scenes and moments linger, whether it's Chalky watching Daughter Maitland sing, or the dying Sagorsky telling Richard his terrible war story from the Philippines, or Lansky and Luciano having their falling-out because of Lucky's paranoia about doing a deal with Joe Masseria's cousin." Seth Colter Walls of Vulture gave the episode a 4 star rating out of 5 and wrote, "At this point, the Boardwalk Empire universe is large enough that I'd be happy to watch movie-length episodes, just so more of the characters could have richer, longer scenes that engage all the things we already know about them. But for now we can hope that, by the time all the story arcs converge at season's end, it won't feel too forced."

Rodrigo Perez of IndieWire wrote, "Thematically, we're following a 'North Star' considering guiding lights reunite several estranged members of the Boardwalk Empire cast, even if it's a bit of a mid-season episode lull. Perhaps the writers had to give audiences a reprieve after the sad suicide of Eddie Kessler last episode." Chris O'Hara of TV Fanatic gave the episode a perfect 5 star rating out of 5 and wrote, "It was good to see Margaret, but she was smart not to divulge too much information, especially if Joe Masseria in New York looks to hurt Nucky at some point. Richard has some catching up to do, but his return was also nice to see. Adding some levity to an emotion filled episode was the always jocular Mickey Doyle."

Michael Noble of Den of Geek wrote, "As I have mentioned before, Boardwalk Empire is a rich enough canvas that it can handle character absences, even protracted ones, without losing pace or touch. In the case of Margaret, it is particularly effective, deliberate even, as she, paradoxically, is present in her absence." Paste gave the episode a 7 out of 10 rating and wrote, "It wasn't enough to fully imbue these parts of the episode with life, but it was enough to keep them from taking away too much of its momentum. We're halfway through the season, but at least it finally feels like it's starting to take us somewhere interesting."
