= The Bag or the Bat =

- Ray Donovan episode
- Episode no.: Season 1 Episode 1
- Directed by: Allen Coulter
- Written by: Ann Biderman
- Original air date: June 30, 2013
- Running time: 58 minutes

Guest appearances
- Peter Jacobson as Lee Drexler; Ambyr Childers as Ashley Rucker; Josh Pais as Stu Feldman; Johnathon Schaech as Sean Walker; Austin Nichols as Tommy Wheeler; Mo McRae as Deonte Frasier; Denise Crosby as Deb; William Stanford Davis as Potato Pie; Collin Christopher as Stalker-Robert; James Mathers as Priest; Elliott Gould as Ezra Goldman

Episode chronology
← Previous —	Next → "A Mouth Is a Mouth"

"The Bag or the Bat" is the pilot episode of the Showtime original series Ray Donovan. It premiered on June 30, 2013, and was directed by Allen Coulter and written by series creator Ann Biderman. Prior to the premiere television airing, the episode was uploaded to YouTube by Showtime and was previewed over 150,000 times.

The pilot episode introduces all members of the main cast as well as a number of recurring characters. The titular character of Ray Donovan (played by Liev Schreiber) works as a "fixer" for Lee Drexler (Peter Jacobson) and Ezra Goldman (Elliott Gould), cleaning up serious situations for elite Hollywood players. Donovan is aided by his team of Avi (Steven Bauer) and Lena (Katherine Moennig), and works to balance his demanding job schedule with his family life. His wife, Abby (Paula Malcomson) is aware of her husband's profession, as are their children Bridget (Kerris Dorsey) and Connor (Devon Bagby). Ray's brothers Terry (Eddie Marsan) and Bunchy (Dash Mihok) run a local gym, using their skills as past boxers to make a living. Also at the gym and in training is their half-brother, Daryll (Pooch Hall). The series begins when Mickey Donovan (Jon Voight) is unexpectedly released from prison 5 years early and is anxious to reunite with his family. Ray is responsible for his father's incarceration and will stop at nothing to protect his family from Mickey.

== Plot ==
In Massachusetts, following his release from prison, Irish gangster Mickey Donovan is driven to a church and murders a priest. In California, Mickey's son Ray works as a fixer for the high-powered Los Angeles law firm of Goldman & Drexler. Ray and his associate Avi are summoned to a hotel room, where Deonte Frasier has woken up next to a dead girl after a night of partying. Ray's employer, Lee Drexler, sends him to rectify a situation involving Tommy Wheeler, a young movie star and closeted homosexual who is rumored to have picked up a transvestite hooker. Ray decides to merge the two cases and replace Deonte with Tommy, clearing Deonte of any involvement with the dead girl and drawing attention away from the rumors about Tommy. With Lena acting as Tommy's publicist, the swap is successful, and Tommy is taken to rehab to complete the ruse.

One of Lee's clients, Stu Feldman, needs Ray to keep an eye on his mistress, Ashley. While spying on her at her Malibu beach house, Ray sees a stalker masturbating while watching Ashley do yoga. The stalker drives off, but not before Avi notes his license plate number. Ray, going against instructions from Stu and Lee, warns Ashley about her stalker. Ashley, who knows Ray from a prior case, tries to seduce him before experiencing a seizure. Ray learns from his brother Terry, a former boxer now afflicted with Parkinson's disease, that his other brother, Bunchy, has suffered a relapse. Bunchy gets a call from Ray after attending a support group for victims of molestation by priests, and is eventually tracked down by Terry. Terry and Bunchy are involved in a bar fight and are bailed out of jail by Ray, who is then told about Mickey's release. Ray is also told that Daryll, who Terry is training at his gym, is their half brother. Ray arrives at the stalker's apartment, where he offers him "the bag or the bat". The stalker chooses the bag, and Ray dyes the stalker green and warns that he will kill the stalker if he approaches Ashley again.

Ray arrives home to find Ashley talking with his wife, Abby. Ray drives Ashley home and warns her to stay away from his family. When driving home, Ray gets a message from Abby telling him not to come home. He stays at his apartment, where he breaks down after flipping through old family photos and seeing a picture of his sister, Bridget, who committed suicide while intoxicated. When he passes out, he has a nightmare where he sees his dying mother being given communion, and relives being molested by a priest. The nightmare ends when he sees Bridget commit suicide. Ray goes home in the morning and, after trying to fix things with Abby, tells her that his father has been released from prison and is coming to California. At a party at Lee's house, Stu tells Abby that Ray had sex with Ashley, and Ray breaks Stu's hand in retaliation. That night, Ray and his brothers wait in the gym for their father. Mickey arrives and accuses Ray of framing him for a crime that put him in prison. Mickey then tells his sons that, after he was released, he killed the priest that molested them when they were children. When Mickey asks how his grandchildren are, Ray threatens to kill him if he goes near the kids and leaves. Ashley sees her stalker on her balcony and Ray severely beats him with a baseball bat. Mickey, after using cocaine with Bunchy, goes to Ray's home and introduces himself to Abby, and his grandchildren, Bridget and Conor.

== Production ==
=== Casting ===
The series was greenlit in August 2011, with a pilot episode being ordered by Showtime. In November 2011, Liev Schreiber was cast in the titular role, making the series his first main role on a television series, and first appearance on television since a four-episode arc on CSI: Crime Scene Investigation in 2007. In January 2012, Paula Malcomson was cast as Abby and Eddie Marsan and Dash Mihok were cast as Terry and Bunchy Donovan, respectively. Jon Voight, Elliott Gould, Peter Jacobson, and Pooch Hall joined the series in February 2012. In March, Steven Bauer and Devon Bagby were cast as Avi and Connor, respectively.

After viewing the pilot, Showtime picked up the series for a 12-episode order in June 2012.

== Reception ==
=== Ratings ===
The premiere airing of "The Bag or the Bat" was viewed by 1.35 million people and received a 0.5 rating in adults aged 18–49. After additional airings, including online views through YouTube and Showtime on Demand, the number of viewers grew to 3.04 million, and became the highest-rated premiere airing of an original series in Showtime's history.

The high ratings for "The Bag or the Bat", in addition to the continued high ratings for the next 2 episodes, led the series to be renewed for a second season on July 16, 2013.

=== Critical reception ===
"The Bag or the Bat" received mixed to positive critical reviews after being released. Writing for IGN, Roth Cornet gave the episode an 8.5/10, praising the performances of both Schreiber and Voight in particular. Writing for The A.V. Club, Emily St. James rated the episode a "C", and wrote that "There are good moments in every episode sent out to critics—five in total—but they're not enough to overcome the crushing sameness of so much of what happens here, nor are they enough to overcome the sense that this show, ambitious as it is, has absolutely no center." St. James did note that "At every level of Ray Donovan, it's evident that talented people are working on the show", and praised Schreiber's performance as Donovan, writing "The strongest reason to watch the show is the cast, which is stocked to the gills with great actors. That starts with Ray himself, Liev Schreiber, who's long been among the most mesmerizing thing onscreen in any of his films and repeats that performance here, in a role that has enough confidence in its leading man to let him be silent often." Writing for The Boston Globe, Matthew Gilbert called the series "the most vital new series of the year so far."
