= Kapone =

Kapone is a surname. Notable people with the name include:

- Al Kapone (born 1973), American rapper
- Jérémy Kapone (born 1990) French actor, singer and songwriter

== See also ==
- Capone (surname)
- K.Pone.Inc, record label
- Kpone, Kpone Katamanso District, Ghana
