= Capone (surname) =

Capone is an Italian surname. Notable people with the surname include:

== Family of Al Capone ==
- Al Capone (1899–1947), prominent American gangster in Chicago from the 1920s
- Albert Francis Capone (1918–2004), American gangster also known as Sonny, son of Al Capone
- Frank Capone (1895–1924), American mobster in Chicago, brother of Al Capone
- James Vincenzo Capone (1892–1952), American prohibition agent, legally changed his name to Richard James Hart after the First World War, oldest brother of Al Capone
- Ralph Capone (1894–1974), American mobster in Chicago, brother of Al Capone
- Mae Capone (1897–1986), American wife and widow of Al Capone

== Other Capones ==
- Andrea Capone (born 1981), Italian football midfielder
- Alessandro Capone (director) (born 1955), Italian film director and screenwriter
- Carlo Capone (born 1957), Italian rally racing driver
- Claudio Capone (1952–2008), Italian film and television program narrator
- Julie St. Claire (born 1969, born/credited Juliette Capone), American film celebrity
- Loredana Capone (born 1964), Italian politician
- Louis Capone (1896–1944), American mobster in New York
- Tom Capone (1966–2004), born Luiz Antonio Ferreira Gonçalves, Brazilian music producer and guitarist
- Tomer Capone (born 1985), Israeli actor
- Warren Capone (born 1951), American football linebacker

== See also ==
- Kapone, surname
