= Allen Coulter =

American television and film director

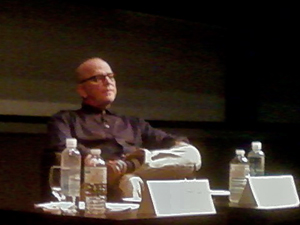
- Born: College Station, Texas, United States
- Occupations: Television director, television producer, film director, screenwriter, film producer.
- Years active: 1978–present

Allen Coulter is an American television and film director, credited with a number of successful television programs. He has directed two feature films, Hollywoodland, a film regarding the questionable death of George Reeves starring Adrien Brody, Diane Lane, and Ben Affleck, and the 2010 film Remember Me.

Coulter was born in College Station, Texas. He went on to study theater direction at the University of Texas, after which he moved to New York to pursue his career in film.

== Filmography ==
Film

- Hollywoodland (2006)
- Remember Me (2010)

Television

- Monsters (1989)
  - episode 21 "All in a Day's Work"
  - episode 25 "The Face"
- The X-Files (1993) 1 episode:
  - episode 5.17 "All Souls"
- Millennium (1996) 3 episodes:
  - episode 2.02 "Beware of the Dog"
  - episode 2.14 "The Pest House"
  - episode 2.17 "Siren"
- Sex and the City (1998) 9 episodes:
  - episode 2.01 "Take Me Out to the Ballgame"
  - episode 2.02 "The Awful Truth"
  - episode 2.03 "The Freak Show"
  - episode 2.04 "They Shoot Single People, Don't They?"
  - episode 2.05 "Four Women and a Funeral"
  - episode 3.17 "What Goes Around Comes Around"
  - episode 3.18 "Cock-A-Doodle-Do"
  - episode 4.03 "Defining Moments"
  - episode 4.04 "What's Sex Got to Do With It?"
- The Sopranos (1999) 12 episodes:
  - episode 1.05 "College"
  - episode 1.12 "Isabella"
  - episode 2.01 "Guy Walks into a Psychiatrist's Office..."
  - episode 2.07 "D-Girl"
  - episode 2.08 "Full Leather Jacket"
  - episode 2.12 "The Knight in White Satin Armor"
  - episode 3.01 "Mr. Ruggerio's Neighborhood"
  - episode 3.06 "University"
  - episode 3.08 "He Is Risen"
  - episode 4.01 "For All Debts Public and Private"
  - episode 5.05 "Irregular Around the Margins"
  - episode 5.11 "The Test Dream"
- Six Feet Under (2001) 1 episode:
  - episode 1.08 "Crossroads"
- Rome (2005) 2 episodes:
  - episode 1.05 "The Ram has Touched the Wall"
  - episode 2.02 "Son of Hades"
- Damages (2007) 1 episode:
  - episode 1.01 "Get Me a Lawyer"
- Law & Order (2008) 1 episode:
  - episode 18.1 "Called Home"
- Sons of Anarchy (2008) 1 episode:
  - episode 1.01 "Pilot" (co-directed by Michael Dinner)
- Nurse Jackie (2009) 1 episode:
  - episode 1.01 "Pilot"
- Law & Order: LA (2010) 1 episode:
  - episode 1.01 "Hollywood"
- Rubicon (2010) 1 episode:
  - episode 1.01 "Gone in the Teeth"
- Boardwalk Empire (2010) 8 episodes:
  - episode 1.07 "Home"
  - episode 1.11 "Paris Green"
  - episode 2.07 "Peg of Old"
  - episode 2.11 "Under God's Power She Flourishes"
  - episode 3.07 "Sunday Best"
  - episode 3.11 "Two Imposters"
  - episode 4.03 "Acres of Diamonds"
  - episode 4.06 "The North Star"
  - episode 4.11 "Havre de Grace"
  - episode 5.02 "The Good Listener"
- House of Cards (2013) 2 episodes:
  - episode 1.12 "Chapter 12"
  - episode 1.13 "Chapter 13"
- Ray Donovan (2013) 4 episodes:
  - episode 1.01 "The Bag or the Bat"
  - episode 1.02 "A Mouth Is a Mouth"
  - episode 6.01 "Staten Island, Part One"
  - episode 6.02 "Staten Island, Part Two"
- Extant (2014) 1 episode:
  - episode 1 "Re-Entry"
- Vinyl (2016) 3 episodes:
  - episode 1.02 "Yesterday Once More"
  - episode 1.07 "The King and I"
  - episode 1.10 "Alibi"
- Get Shorty (2017) 1 episode:
  - episode 1.01 "The Pitch"
- For All Mankind (2019) 2 episodes:
  - episode 1.03 "Nixon's Women"
  - episode 1.04 "Prime Crew"
- Super Pumped (2022) 1 episode:
  - episode 1.01 "Grow or Die"
- Tulsa King (2022) 2 episodes:
  - episode 1.01 "Go West, Old Man"
  - episode 1.02 "Center of the Universe"
