= Owney Madden =

American mobster (1891–1965)

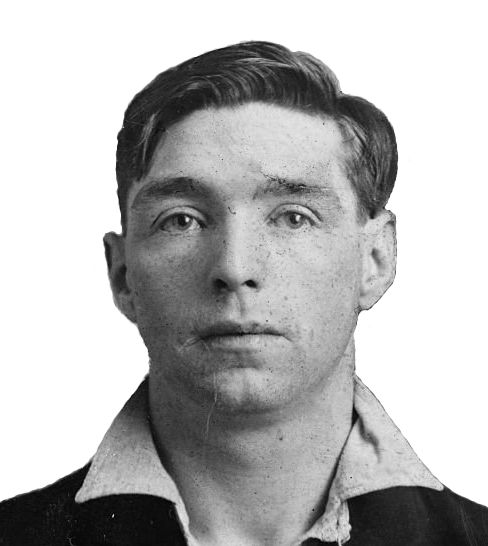
- Owney Madden in 1931 New York City Police Department mugshot
- Born: Owen Vincent Madden; December 18, 1891; Leeds, England
- Died: April 24, 1965 (aged 73); Hot Springs, Arkansas, US
- Other name: The Killer
- Occupation: Gangster

Owen Vincent "Owney" Madden (December 18, 1891 – April 24, 1965) was an English-born Irish-American gangster who was a leading underworld figure in New York during Prohibition. Nicknamed "The Killer", he garnered a brutal reputation within street gangs and organized crime. He ran the Cotton Club in Manhattan and was a leading boxing promoter. After increased attention from law enforcement in New York, Madden moved to Hot Springs, Arkansas, in 1935, where he remained until his death from natural causes in 1965.

== Early life ==
Owen Vincent Madden was born into a working-class family at 25 Somerset Road in Leeds, England, on December 18, 1891, the son of Francis Madden and Mary Madden (née O’Neill). Both emigrants from Ireland, his mother being from Sligo and his father from Mayo.

They moved from Leeds to the mining town of Wigan, and from there to Liverpool. Francis had planned for the family to emigrate to America, but after saving the fare, he died before they could book their passage. Mary summoned the courage to take the children on alone, and in 1902, at the age of 11, Owney, along with his mother, his brother Marty and his sister Mary set sail for New York.

He continued to identify as English and spoke his whole life with a northern English accent. He also enjoyed collecting newspaper clippings from the Yorkshire Post. One of his Hell’s Kitchen contemporaries remarked, ‘He was a smart man. A class act, and he wasn’t even Irish. He was born in England. Shows you what a tough bastard he was, just to survive in this neighbourhood.’ In Hell's Kitchen, he lived among the city’s immigrant Irish population, where he relied upon his Irish ethnicity and an established migrant Irish network to further his career in organised crime.

Madden learned how to use blackjacks, brass knuckles, baseball bats, pipes, and knives, including the stiletto. By the age of 21 years old, Madden had become the leader of a feared New York street gang known as the Gopher Gang. He earned the nickname "The Killer" for getting away with two brazen murders. On September 6, 1911, he shot dead a gang member of the rival Hudson Dusters in the heart of Dusters' territory around 30th Street. In February 1912, Madden was on a crowded street trolley, arguing with a store clerk named William Henshaw about a woman. Madden shot Henshaw, a non-gang member, in the face; as he was dying, Henshaw named Madden as his killer. Despite the police having his name and eyewitnesses to the crime, Madden never went to trial—witnesses in both killings were intimidated, and disappeared.

In 1915, he eventually went to prison for ordering the killing of William "Little Patsy Doyle" Moore, who had been waging a three-year vendetta campaign against Madden and the Gopher Gang.

== Prohibition ==
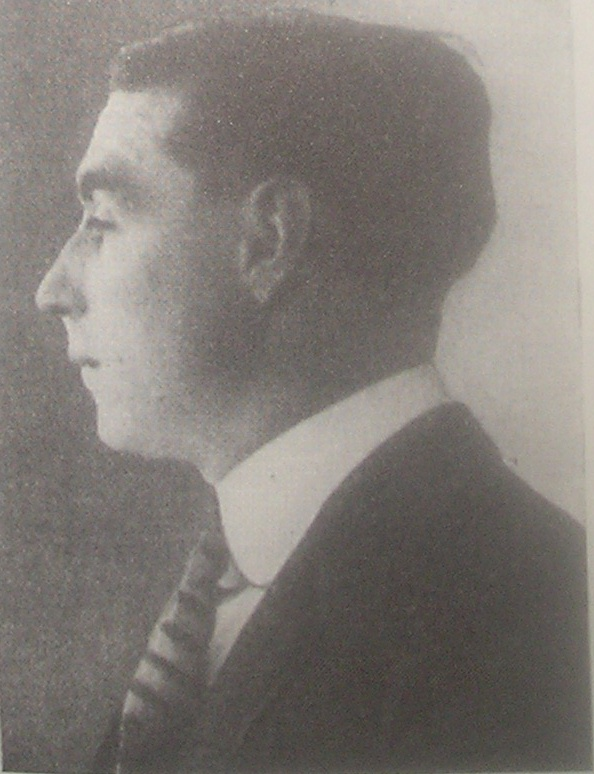
NYPD mug shot of Madden (first published in 1926)

After serving seven years of a 10-to-20-year sentence for Moore's manslaughter, Madden was released on parole in 1923. The Gopher Gang had broken up, and many members of his own faction were either in Sing Sing or working for bootlegging gangs.

During this time, Madden employed a young friend as a personal driver. The driver, George Raft, later became a film star noted for his authentic portrayals of gangland figures.

== The Cotton Club ==
Madden purchased the Club Deluxe from former heavyweight boxing champion Jack Johnson and reopened it a year later. Nightclub patrons flooded into Harlem from downtown Manhattan to catch performers such as Cab Calloway, Duke Ellington, Louis Armstrong, Lena Horne, Bill "Bojangles" Robinson, and the Nicholas Brothers. Madden and his partners, Big Bill and George Jean "Big Frenchy" DeMange, also muscled their way into a piece of the exclusive Stork Club, where the influential gossip columnist Walter Winchell held court and everyone who was anyone wanted to see and be seen. As a celebrity with ownership in more than twenty night clubs, Madden became well-known and glamorized for his Prohibition-era activities. He also gained recognition for his revenge tactics and payoffs of City Hall.

== Self-exile in Hot Springs ==
In 1932, Madden was involved in the murder of Vincent "Mad Dog" Coll, who had been extorting money from several mobsters, including DeMange and Madden. After being arrested for a parole violation that same year, Madden began facing greater harassment from police and encroachment on his territory by Italian-American Mafia families, until he finally left New York in 1935.

Leaving behind racketeering, Madden settled in Hot Springs, Arkansas, which had become known as a haven for various criminals, with a corrupt city government and police force. He also became involved in local criminal activities, especially illegal gambling. The Southern Club became a popular nightspot for mobsters; Charles "Lucky" Luciano was apprehended there in 1936. Madden became a naturalized U.S. citizen in 1943 and later married the daughter of the city postmaster. He lived in Hot Springs until his death in 1965.
