= Gaston Means =

American con artist (1879–1938)

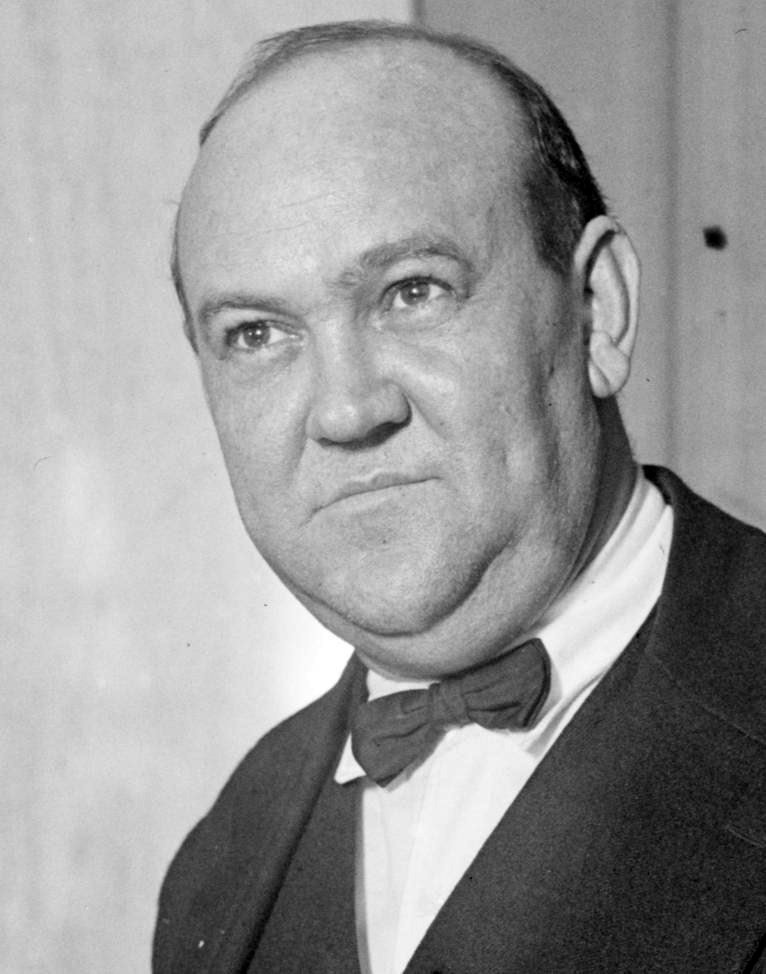
- Means in 1924
- Born: Gaston Bullock Means; July 11, 1879; Concord, North Carolina, U.S.
- Died: December 12, 1938 (aged 59); USP Leavenworth, Leavenworth, Kansas, U.S.
- Education: University of North Carolina
- Occupations: Private detective, salesman, author, bootlegger, forger, swindler, murder suspect, blackmailer, con artist

Gaston Bullock Means (July 11, 1879 – December 12, 1938) was an American private detective, salesman, bootlegger, forger, swindler, murder suspect, blackmailer, and con artist.

While not involved in the Teapot Dome scandal, Means was associated with other members of the so-called Ohio Gang that gathered around the administration of President Warren G. Harding. Means also tried to pull a con associated with the Lindbergh kidnapping, and died in prison following his criminal conviction.

== Biography ==
Gaston Bullock Means was born in Concord, North Carolina, the son of William Means, a reputable lawyer. He was also a great-nephew of Confederate General Rufus Barringer. He was in the first graduating class of Concord High School in 1896, graduated from the University of North Carolina in 1903, became a schoolteacher, then a travelling salesman. His life avocation, however, was that of a confidence trickster. J. Edgar Hoover once called him "the most amazing figure in contemporary criminal history" because of his ability to weave a believable, albeit fraudulent, story. In 1911, he talked himself into a job with a New York detective firm where he created reports that contained so many clues that they must either be investigated further (at a substantial cost) or denounced utterly. His reputation spread. On the eve of World War I, he was asked to further Germany's interests in the neutral United States. He "uncovered" plots and counterplots rife with secret documents and skulking spies, all of which required investigation at his usual rate of $100 (gold standard dollars) per day.

After America declared war on Germany, Means returned to being a private detective. There, he was given a case involving Maude King, the widow of a wealthy lumberman, who had fallen into the clutches of a swindler in Europe. King had been left $100,000 by her late husband, with the remainder of his $3 million estate intended for charity. She sued for more and settled for $600,000 plus the interest on $400,000. Means ingratiated himself into King's life and assisted her with her business affairs. Under the guise of investing her money, Means deposited hundreds of thousands of dollars to his own credit in New York and Chicago, invested in cotton and the stock market and lost heavily. Claiming to find a new will which required "investigation", Means plundered the remainder of the woman's finances until they were nearly all gone. On August 29, 1917, the widow went with Means to a firing range. Means returned with her body, claiming she had killed herself, perhaps accidentally while handling his gun.

Means' account was disputed by the coroner; no powder marks were found near the wound in her head, discounting a self-inflicted wound. Maude was fearful of pistols and she was planning to remarry. Means was indicted for murder and after deliberating for only 15 minutes, a jury in his home town acquitted him, after defense counsel cleverly whipped up local jury resentment against New York lawyers who were assisting the prosecution. The will was declared a forgery and Means was prosecuted. Testimony showed that the witnesses to the purported will were out of town on the day it was signed, the typewriter used to type the document had not yet been manufactured when the will was purportedly written and King's signature and those of other witnesses were not genuine.

The trial was going badly for Means when he declared that he knew the location of a trunk filled with secret documents obtained from German spies. In exchange for a letter to the judge attesting to his good character from the United States Army, he said, he would hand over that trunk. An Army Intelligence officer was assigned to accompany Means to locate the trunk, which he did, handing it over on the condition that it be sent to Washington intact. Then, baggage claim in hand, he hurried to Washington, declared he had kept his end of the bargain and demanded the promised letter attesting to his good service. Alas, the trunk arrived and it was found to contain no documents. Declaring he knew who had done this "despicable thing", Means promised to find the scoundrels and recover the lost papers. The army investigated and discovered the weight of the trunk when sent was identical to its weight when opened.

In later years, Means boasted to friends that he had been accused of every felony in the criminal law books, up to and including murder. FBI Director J. Edgar Hoover, who then was the deputy director of the BOI, wrote that Means was "the most amazing figure in contemporary criminal history" and "the greatest faker of all time".

Although he had a shady reputation as a detective, in October 1921, Means was hired by the Bureau of Investigation and he moved to Washington, D.C. The FBI was then led by William J. Burns, famous ex-Secret Service man, private detective and friend of Harry M. Daugherty, Attorney General in the Harding administration. Burns had employed Means as a detective and thought Means had great skill as an investigator. According to Gaston Means, beginning in late October 1921 Means became a confidant and client to Mrs. Harding about Department of Justice (DOJ) investigations involving individuals associated with Warren Harding's inner clique including Col. Darwin who was associated with oil leases, Albert B. Fall, Daugherty and John W. Weeks. Following Means investigations in support of Mrs. Harding into Harry Daugherty, Jess Smith, who lived at the Wardman Park Hotel with his roommate Harry Daugherty, and Nan Britton who Mrs. Harding believed had an undue influence over President Harding, Means was later suspended from the BOI at the insistence of Daugherty with strong support from President Harding because the Secret Service was the only branch of government that has any power to attend to any Presidential matters; however, Means under advice from Means' attorney Col. T. B. Felder asserted that Means' support to Mrs. Harding was not solely under the jurisdiction of the Secret Service.

=== Bootleggers' helper ===
Although the United States was officially "dry" during the Harding years as a result of Prohibition, illegal alcohol was common. In the late fall of 1922, Means began selling his services to local Washington bootleggers, with the offer that he could use his connections to "fix" their legal problems with the government.

In 1924, following Harding's death, Congress held hearings on the Justice Department's role in failing to oversee their Prohibition duties under the Volstead Act. Means testified against former Attorney General Daugherty. Means "confessed" to handling bribes for senior officials in the former Harding Administration. He declared the country was being despoiled and that he had the documents to prove it. When asked to produce them, Means readily agreed but returned with a story that "two sergeants-at-arms" had appeared at his home, produced an order signed by the head of the committee and had taken the documents away with them. The committee head examined the "order" and declared his signature a forgery. Means leaped from his chair. "Forgery!" he said. "I've been tricked by my enemies. I'll run them down if it's the last thing I do!" After testifying before the Brookhart-Wheeler committee, Gaston Means signed an affidavit stating that his entire testimony was false and that he had only given it because senator Burton Wheeler had promised to get the then current charges against him dismissed. Means further admitted in his affidavit that he had coached the other witness in the case, Roxie Stinson.

The congressional investigation also revealed evidence of Means' role in the illegal issuance of Prohibition-era liquor permits. Means was indicted for perjury and tried before a jury. In intentionally sensational testimony, Means implicated both Harding and Secretary of the Treasury Andrew Mellon as being part of the cover-up. Unable to support his own counter-charges and unable to convince the jury of his innocence, Means was found guilty of perjury and sentenced to two years in federal prison.

=== Professional con man ===
During and after his term in the federal penitentiary, Means retained his reputation as the ultimate man who knew all of the secrets. He put this reputation to work in his book, The Strange Death of President Harding (1930). The exposé alleged that Harding had been consciously complicit in all of the major scandals of his administration. The book's status as a bestseller derived in considerable measure from its insinuation that the President had been murdered by his wife, First Lady Florence Harding, with assistance from the couple's personal physician, Charles E. Sawyer. Mrs. Harding's alleged motivation was that she had become aware of her husband's corruption and marital infidelity and wanted to protect his reputation.

Means' accusations seemed to some to be true. The writer had learned many facts about Harding's sex life from the rumor mill in Washington. A 1933 counter-exposé, published in Liberty, blew the cover off of the dubious book. Part-time journalistic stringer Mae Dixon Thacker confessed that not only had she ghostwritten the book for Means but also that Means had bilked her out of her share of the profits. Mrs. Thacker further stated that Means had never provided the documents he swore he had that backed his accusations. Upon further investigation, Thacker had found the accounts Means made in the book were completely false and she stated in Liberty Magazine that the book was a "colossal hoax – a tissue of falsehood from beginning to end."

Having collected his royalties, Means cheerfully repudiated his own book. He had moved on to a new set of victims, a group of New York men who were interested in subversive Soviet activities. Means claimed to have the goods on two Soviets intent on wreaking havoc in the United States with $2 million earmarked for that purpose. He took on the case at his usual price of $100 per day. His investigation dragged out for three years as Means promised to bring the secret agents to justice and to capture 24 trunks and 11 suitcases full of secret orders, plans and diaries. He claimed several times that he almost got those trunks and suitcases and once did so, he said, but upon his return to New York, the secret agents stole them back again. Finally, he delivered the news that one of the Russians had murdered the other and all the documents had been burned. He told his story so convincingly that an arrest warrant was sworn out against the killer, for a murder that existed only in Means's imagination.

Following the Lindbergh kidnapping of 1932, Means attempted the most audacious con job of his career. Means was contacted by the Washington socialite Evalyn Walsh McLean (owner of the Hope Diamond), who asked him to use his connections in the East Coast underworld to assist in the recovery of the Lindbergh child. Means declared that he knew the whereabouts of the victim. He offered his services as a go-between and asked for $100,000 to pass on to the kidnappers. The credulous McLean sent Means the money and Means promptly disappeared, while a confederate kept McLean apprised of Means's difficulties and the fabulous chase. Means later came to McLean at her home again and said he would need an additional $4,000 to pay the expenses of the kidnappers; she had a $6,000 check cashed at one of the banks in Washington and turned $4,000 over to him. Finally, Means met McLean in a southern resort, promising to deliver the baby. Instead, he showed up with a man he introduced as the "King of the Kidnappers", who told her how and when the baby would be delivered. Everyone was given a code, Means was No. 27, the "King" was No. 19, Norman Tweed Whitaker was "The Fox", McLean was No. 11, and the baby was "The Book". The missing baby (who was later found murdered) did not show up and the next thing that McLean heard from Means was a demand for another $35,000. Failing to raise it, the heiress demanded all the money back. Means agreed, hurried to get it – and didn't come back. Confronted about his duplicity, Means expressed astonishment. "Didn't Mrs. McLean get it?", he asked. "She must have it. Her messenger met me at the bridge outside Alexandria as I was returning to Washington. He said 'I am Number 11.' So what was I to do? I gave him the money." This time, the heiress called the police, Means was captured, found guilty of grand larceny, and sentenced to serve 15 years in a federal penitentiary but the money was never recovered. Means was assigned, transported, and imprisoned at the United States Penitentiary at Leavenworth, Kansas, where he died in custody in 1938.

== See also ==
- Little Green House on K Street

== Sources ==
- Dean, John; Schlesinger, Arthur M. Warren Harding (The American President Series), Times Books, 2004.
- Ferrell, Robert H. The Strange Deaths of President Harding. University of Missouri Press, 1996.
- Mee, Charles L. Jr. The Ohio Gang: A Historical Entertainment. M. Evans, 1991.
- "The Amazing Mr. Means" by J. Edgar Hoover, The American Magazine December 1936 reprinted in Reader's Digest March 1937 p. 30.
- United States of America vs. Gaston B. Means and Norman T. Whitaker, Criminal No. 53134, May 8, 1933.
