= Frank Capone =

Italian-American Chicago mobster (1895–1924)

- Born: Salvatore Capone; July 16, 1895; Brooklyn, New York, U.S.
- Died: April 1, 1924 (aged 28); Chicago, Illinois, U.S.
- Resting place: Mount Carmel Cemetery, Hillside, Illinois, U.S.
- Occupation: Mobster
- Relatives: Al Capone (brother); James Vincenzo Capone (brother); Ralph Capone (brother)
- Allegiance: Chicago Outfit

Salvatore "Frank" Capone (/kəˈpoʊn/ kə-POHN, Italian: [salvaˈtoːre kaˈpoːne]; July 16, 1895 – April 1, 1924) was an Italian-American mobster who participated in the attempted takeover of Cicero, Illinois by the Chicago Outfit. He worked in the businesses with his brothers Al Capone and Ralph Capone.

== Early life ==
Frank Capone was born in 1895 in Brooklyn, and he was the third son of the Italian immigrants Gabriele Capone (1865–1920) and Teresa Raiola (1867-1952). He was the brother of Vincenzo, Ralph, Alphonse, Ermina, John, Albert, Matthew and Mafalda Capone. Frank and his brothers Al and Ralph became mobsters. Growing up in New York, both Frank and Al became involved in the Five Points Gang with mobster John Torrio. By 1918, Torrio had moved to Chicago to help a relative defend his rackets, and Torrio soon asked Al and later Frank to join him there.

By 1920, Torrio had taken charge of the South Side Gang and the Prohibition era had started. As the gang increased in power and wealth, so did Al and Frank.

== Takeover of Cicero ==
In 1923, Chicago voters elected a new mayor, William Dever, who proceeded to crack down on Torrio, the Capone brothers, and their South Side Gang. In response, Torrio tasked Al with creating speakeasies, brothels, and illegal gambling dens in Cicero, a Chicago suburb. Within a year, Capone had placed the Cicero city manager Joseph Z. Klenha and the town committeemen on the gang payroll. Frank Capone's job was to represent the gang in its dealings with the Cicero town council. Frank was mild-mannered compared to his brother Al, projecting the image of a respectable businessman, and always dressed in a neat suit.

In the April 1, 1924 Cicero municipal election, Democratic Party politicians mounted a serious election challenge to Republican Klenha and his associates. To protect the gang's political control of Cicero, Frank unleashed a wave of terror on the city. He sent South Side Gang members to the polling booths with submachine guns and sawed-off shotguns to make sure that local residents "voted right". Uncooperative voters were assaulted and blocked from voting. Frank led an attack on an opponent's campaign headquarters, ransacking his office and assaulting several campaign workers. One campaign worker was shot in both legs and detained with eight other campaign workers, to be released when Election Day was over.

== Death and police reinforcements ==
As the election day turmoil progressed, outraged Cicero citizens petitioned Cook County Judge Edmund K. Jarecki for help. The Chicago Police Department (CPD) sent 70 plainclothes officers to Cicero to maintain order at the polls and Jarecki swore them in as deputy sheriffs. The CPD officers did not arrive on the streets of Cicero until late afternoon, at which point they had little effect on the election-related violence.

photo diagram of the shootout in which Capone was killed

Around dusk, a detective squad led by Sergeant William Cusack pulled up to the polling station at Cicero Avenue and Twenty-second Street after spotting Frank Capone, Charlie Fischetti, and a short, heavyset man they didn't recognize. The detectives exited their car and began walking over when gunfire inexplicably erupted. Several witnesses later claimed that the gangsters never opened fire. At the later inquest, the police claimed that Frank Capone shot first; they produced a pistol with three missing rounds that they swore he used. Frank allegedly thought these officers in civilian clothing were rival gangsters. In either event, Capone was fatally shot many times by Sergeant Phillip J. McGlynn in the ensuing melee. Fischetti sprinted across a nearby vacant lot, only to toss down his weapon and surrender once the police caught up with him. The third gangster ran south, firing a gun in each hand, and managed to escape. An urban myth later grew that this man was none other than Al Capone. In fact, the third gunman was later positively identified as David Hedlin; the police had wounded him, as well.

At the end of the day, the Capone candidate Klenha had won.

== Mob funeral ==
After Frank's death, the Chicago newspapers were full of articles either praising or condemning the CPD. A coroner's inquest later determined that Frank's killing was a justifiable shooting since Frank had been resisting arrest.

On April 4, 1924, Frank Capone received an extravagant funeral, with $20,000 worth of flowers placed around the silver-plated casket and over 150 cars in the motorcade. Al purchased the flowers from a shop belonging to his North Side Gang rival, Dean O'Banion. Frank was interred at Mount Carmel Cemetery outside Chicago. The Chicago Tribune reported that the event was appropriate for "a fitting gentleman". Out of respect for his dead brother, Al Capone closed the gambling dens and speakeasies of Cicero for two hours during the funeral.

== In popular culture ==
Morgan Spector portrayed Frank Capone in the fourth season of the HBO television show Boardwalk Empire. In the show, Frank is portrayed as charismatic and level-headed, often attempting to cool Al's temper.
