= Valentin Narcisse =

Fictional character from HBO. TV series

- Boardwalk Empire character
- First appearance: "Resignation"
- Last appearance: "Eldorado"
- Portrayed by: Jeffrey Wright

In-universe information
- Gender: Male

Dr. Valentin Narcisse is a fictional character from the HBO TV series Boardwalk Empire, portrayed by Jeffrey Wright. He is a prominent and highly educated underworld figure based in Harlem, New York, and a Black nationalist orator, active in Marcus Garvey's Universal Negro Improvement Association.

== Inspiration ==
Narcisse was based on Casper Holstein, a prominent New York City African-American organized crime figure from the Danish West Indies, who ultimately became the biggest and first massive numbers-runner in Harlem during the Harlem Renaissance.

== Reception ==
Narcisse was the driving force behind the downfall of the few sympathetic characters on Boardwalk Empire, particularly Albert "Chalky" White (Michael K. Williams) and Daughter Maitland (Margot Bingham). His motivations often stem from the need to be right or the thrill of antagonizing people, and he is one of the few characters to never be shown in a good light. Although Wright joined the cast during the show's penultimate season, his character is often cited as one of the series' best villains.
