= Erik LaRay Harvey =

American actor

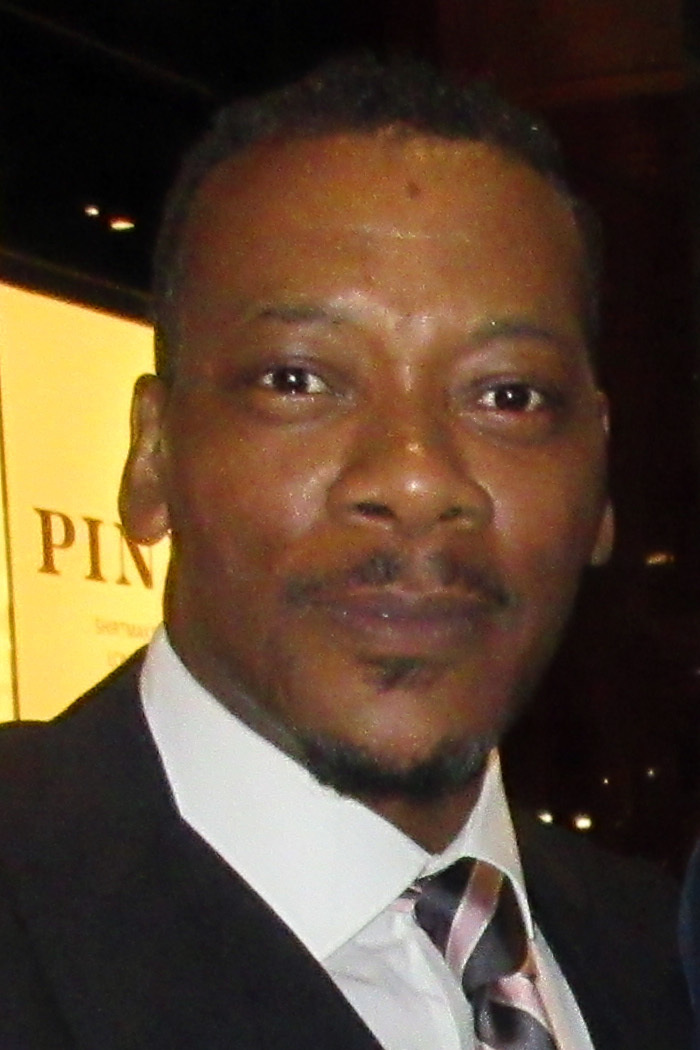
- Harvey in 2019
- Born: Washington, D.C., U.S.
- Education: New York University
- Occupation: Actor
- Years active: 1994–present

Erik LaRay Harvey is an American actor known for his roles as Dunn Purnsley in Boardwalk Empire, Willis Stryker / Diamondback in Luke Cage, and his role in The Charnel House (2016).

== Early life ==
Harvey was born in Washington, D.C. In his youth, he aspired to be a dentist, but was drawn into acting when he saw a theatrical performance of The Wiz. Harvey graduated from the Tisch School of the Arts at New York University in 1991.

== Career ==
Harvey has performed in feature films, television series, and TV movies. Early TV roles include two episodes of Law & Order (1994 and 1998); two episodes of NYPD Blue (1997 and 2003); Now and Again; and Third Watch. He appears in two additional Law & Order series: Law & Order: Special Victims Unit (two episodes; 2003 and 2013) and Law & Order: Criminal Intent (one episode; 2005). Roles in feature films include Twister, The Caveman's Valentine and Rounders.

His two major roles have been on the HBO series Boardwalk Empire as Dunn Purnsley (2011–2013) and the Netflix series Luke Cage as Willis "Diamondback" Stryker.

== Filmography ==
=== Film ===
Year	Title	Role
1996	Twister	Eric
1998	Rounders	Roy
2001	The Caveman's Valentine	Young Rom
2001	K-PAX	Security Guard
2003	Marci X	Stage Manager
2004	Everyday People	Bartender
2004	Proud	Kevin / James Graham
2005	Crazy for Love	Orderly
2014	Friends and Romans	Qarl with a 'Q'
2016	The Charnel House	Devin Pyles
2018	Proud Mary	Reggie
2018	Can You Ever Forgive Me?	Agent Solonas
2019	Bolden	Bartley
2021	The United States vs. Billie Holiday	Monroe

=== Television ===
Year	Title	Role	Notes
1994, 1998	Law & Order	Marty Pine, Off. Anthony Loomis	2 episodes
1997, 2003	NYPD Blue	Wexler, Nathan Dale	2 episodes
1999	Now and Again	Cyrus Jones	Episode: "Pulp Turkey" as Eric LaRay Harvey
2001	Third Watch	Redd	Episode: "A Rock and a Hard Place" as Eric LaRay Harvey
2003	Queens Supreme	Lawyer	Episode: "Mad About You" as Eric LaRay Harvey
2003, 2013, 2022	Law & Order: Special Victims Unit	Sam Randall, Randy Fowler, Jax Bell	3 episodes
2004	Clubhouse	Officer	Episode: "Pilot" as Eric LaRay Harvey
2005	Law & Order: Criminal Intent	Deputy Warden	Episode: "Prisoner" as Eric Laray Harvey
2006	Brotherhood	Lee Mayberry	Episode: "Mark 8:36"
2011–2013	Boardwalk Empire	Dunn Purnsley	15 episodes
2012	NYC 22	Sgt. Crown	Episode: "Self Cleaning Oven"
2014 and 2023	Chicago P.D.	Devon Tucker and Lew Atwater	2 episodes
2014	Believe	Marcus Krakauer	2 episodes
2016	Luke Cage	Willis Stryker / Diamondback	Series regular; 7 episodes Nominated—SAG Award for Outstanding Performance by a Stunt Ensemble in a Television Series
2017	Godless	Elias Hobbs	4 episodes
2018	Sneaky Pete	Ray Chapman / Bratton	Episode: "Inside Out"
2018	Bull	William Flanigan	Episode: "Keep Your Friends Close"
2018	The Blacklist	FBI Agent Brandon Graves	Episode: "The Capricorn Killer (No. 19)"
2019–present	Godfather of Harlem	Del Chance	

=== Video games ===
Year	Title	Role
2014	Wolfenstein: The New Order	Bombate
