= Boardwalk Empire season 3 =

Boardwalk Empire
- Season 3
- DVD cover
- No. of episodes: 12

Release
- Original network: HBO
- Original release: September 16 – December 2, 2012

Season chronology
- ← Previous; Season 2 Next → Season 4

The third season of the HBO television series Boardwalk Empire premiered on September 16, 2012 and concluded on December 2, 2012, consisting of 12 episodes. The series was created by Terence Winter and based on the book Boardwalk Empire: The Birth, High Times and Corruption of Atlantic City by Nelson Johnson. Set in Atlantic City, New Jersey, during the Prohibition era, the series stars Steve Buscemi as Enoch "Nucky" Thompson (based on the historical Enoch "Nucky" Johnson), a political figure who rose to prominence and controlled Atlantic City, New Jersey, during the Prohibition period of the 1920s and early 1930s. Taking place 16 months after season two, the third season begins on New Year's Eve 1922 and concludes in June 1923. The third season was released on DVD and Blu-ray in region 1 on August 20, 2013.

== Cast ==
=== Main ===
Charlie Cox was promoted to main cast after recurring in the previous season, and Bobby Cannavale joined the cast. Michael Pitt, Aleksa Palladino, Paz de la Huerta and Dabney Coleman all departed the cast.

- Steve Buscemi as Enoch "Nucky" Thompson, the protagonist of the series. He is now the former treasurer of Atlantic City, Margaret's husband and Teddy and Emily's stepfather.
- Kelly Macdonald as Margaret Thompson, Nucky's wife and Teddy and Emily's biological mother who tries to open a women's hospital.
- Michael Shannon as Nelson Van Alden/George Mueller, a former Bureau of Prohibition agent who is now on the run from them and is living in Chicago where he gets embroiled into Capone's conflict.
- Shea Whigham as Elias "Eli" Thompson, Nucky's younger brother and the former sheriff of Atlantic City who's looking to regain his brother's trust and help out his family.
- Michael Stuhlbarg as Arnold Rothstein, a New York gangster and gambler doing business with Nucky.
- Stephen Graham as Al Capone, Torrio's protege and an up-and-coming gangster who gets into a conflict with O'Banion.
- Vincent Piazza as Charlie Luciano, Rothstein's protege and Meyer's friend and business partner who hopes to be like his mentor.
- Michael Kenneth Williams as Albert "Chalky" White, a black gangster, Nucky's business partner and leader of Atlantic City's black community.
- Anthony Laciura as Eddie Kessler, Nucky's bumbling German butler suffering from his verbal abuse.
- Paul Sparks as Mieczyslaw "Mickey Doyle" Kuzik, a comedic and bumbling Polish-American gangster and bootlegger who now owns one of Nucky's warehouses and is partners with him.
- Jack Huston as Richard Harrow, a half-faced WW1 veteran who is also the caretaker for Tommy.
- Charlie Cox as Owen Sleater, Nucky's bodyguard and a former IRA assassin and bomb-maker who has a complicated love affair with Margaret.
- Bobby Cannavale as Gyp Rosetti, the main antagonist of the season. A hot-headed and impulsive Italian gangster from Sicily who strikes up an intense rivalry with Nucky while also flirting with Gillian.
- Gretchen Mol as Gillian Darmody, the owner of the Artemis Club, Richard's boss and Tommy's grandmother who has now gone deranged and suffering from delusions of her deceased son still being alive.

=== Recurring ===
- Chris Caldovino as Tonino Sandrelli, Gyp's right-hand man who secretly despises him.
- Anatol Yusef as Meyer Lansky, Luciano's business partner and friend
- Josie and Lucy Gallina as Emily Schroeder, Margaret's daughter and Teddy's younger sister suffering from paralysis.
- Meg Chambers Steedle as Billie Kent, Nucky's mistress. A showgirl who wants to be a major actress with Eddie Cantor.
- Declan and Rory McTigue as Theodore "Teddy" Schroeder, Emily's older brother and Margaret's son
- Stephen Root as Gaston Means, a bootlegger and politician who teams up with Nucky and Randolph to outwit Daugherty.
- Brady and Connor Noon as Tommy Darmody, the deceased Jimmy and Angela's son and Gillian's grandson living at the Artemis Club under the care of Richard.
- Ivo Nandi as Joe Masseria, a New York gangster and Gyp and Luciano's mentor who tries to stop any gang wars happening.
- Kevin O'Rourke as Edward L. Bader, the Mayor of Atlantic City and an associate of Nucky's.
- Wrenn Schmidt as Julia Sagorsky, a young and independent woman who later becomes Richard's love interest.
- Mark Borkowski as Paul Sagorsky, Julia's alcoholic father who's a veteran of the Philippine–American War.
- Glenn Fleshler as George Remus, a bootlegger from Ohio and member of the Ohio gang who faces off against Nucky.
- Erik LaRay Harvey as Dunn Purnsley, Chalky's right-hand man from Baltimore
- Ed Jewett as Jess Smith, Harry's friend and aide who's also a member of the Ohio gang.
- Matt Hobby as Thompson House Servant Philip
- Heather Lind as Katy, Nucky and Margaret's former housemaid and Owen's fiancee
- Julianne Nicholson as Esther Randolph, the Deputy US Attorney who teams up with Nucky and Gaston to get rid of Daugherty, Smith and Remus.
- Christiane Seidel as Sigrid, Van Alden/Mueller's wife and Abigail's stepmother living with him in Chicago.
- Michael Zegen as Benjamin Siegel, Luciano and Lansky's young associate
- Joseph Aniska as Agent Stan Sawicki, a corrupt FBI agent who gives leads to Nucky and Mickey.
- Joe Caniano as Jake Guzik, a soft-hearted pimp and associate of Capone and Torrio
- James Cromwell as Andrew W. Mellon, a politician who mentors Nucky on Harry and Jess
- Stephen DeRosa as Eddie Cantor, a comedian and friend of Nucky's worrying about his relationship with Billie.
- Christopher McDonald as Harry Daugherty, Nucky's political rival and the season's secondary antagonist.
- Arron Shiver as Dean O'Banion, an Irish-American Chicago gangster, leader of the North side and Capone's rival
- Kevin Csolak as William "Willie" Thompson, Eli and June's teenage son who works at a lumber yard to provide for his family.
- Greg Antonacci as Johnny Torrio, the leader of the South side and Capone's aging mentor
- Dominic Chianese as Leander Whitlock, the deceased Commodore's former lawyer and now the financer for the Artemis Club.
- Nick Wyman as Dr. Robert Landau, an Atlantic City doctor clashing with Margaret
- Charlie Plummer as Michael Thompson, 1 of Eli and June's sons and William's brother
- Joseph Riccobene as Frankie Yale, a New York gangster and associate of Torrio, Rothstein and Luciano.
- Pearce Bunting as Bill McCoy, a rum-runner and ship captain who does dealings with Nucky.
- William Forsythe as Munya "Manny" Horvitz, a Ukrainian Jewish gangster, former butcher and associate of Nucky's who owns one of his warehouses with Mickey.
- Christina Jackson as Maybelle White, Chalky and Lenore's daughter, Lester and Adeline's sister and Samuel's fiancee who's interested in gangsters.
- Will Janowitz as Hymie Weiss, a Chicago gangster and second-in-command to O'Banion.

== Episodes ==
No. overall	No. in season	Title	Directed by	Written by	Original release date	US viewers (millions)
25	1	"Resolution"	Tim Van Patten	Terence Winter	September 16, 2012	2.89
It's New Year's Eve 1922. Gyp Rosetti is introduced as a violent, easily offended Sicilian mobster from New York City. During a meeting with Nucky, he receives some bad news regarding his new exclusive partnership with Rothstein. In retaliation, he racially insults everyone in the room and storms out. Nucky attends meetings and deals with Margaret's past, which made him an involuntary philanthropist when she donated millions of dollars' worth of New Jersey landholdings. On the lam, Van Alden works as a clothing iron salesman in Chicago and stumbles into a dispute between Al Capone and Dean O'Banion. Jimmy's death has left Richard as his son's caretaker but Gillian refuses to let him learn the truth about his parents. He kills Manny Horvitz to avenege the deaths of Jimmy and Angela.
26	2	"Spaghetti & Coffee"	Alik Sakharov	Howard Korder	September 23, 2012	2.62
Eli gets out of jail and has trouble accepting his brother's plans for him and the new reality at home. Nucky meets 'special investigator' Gaston Means, acting as Harry Daugherty's bagman in New York. Displeased by Nucky's refusal to sell alcohol to anyone but Rothstein, Gyp takes over the strategically situated small town of Tabor Heights, New Jersey and blockades the alcohol shipments between Atlantic City and New York. Margaret's interest for the sanitary conditions at St. Theresa's hospital is met by resistance from patients and doctors; Chalky argues with his daughter about her future.
27	3	"Bone for Tuna"	Jeremy Podeswa	Chris Haddock	September 30, 2012	2.36
Nucky is set to receive an award by the Roman Catholic Church for his charitable work but had insomnia and dreams connected to Jimmy's murder. Richard hears that Mickey is taking credit for one of his killings, while Nelson visits a speakeasy with coworkers. A young Benjamin Siegel is roughed up by Joe Masseria's men. Margaret negotiates a woman's health clinic in an audience with the Bishop. Gyp, having done a temporary deal with Nucky, takes offense to an innocent farewell greeting.
28	4	"Blue Bell Boy"	Kari Skogland	David Stenn	October 7, 2012	2.11
Owen's increasingly prominent role in the bootlegging operation is resented by Nucky when they both end up hiding out in the house of a precocious liquor thief. Capone, whose son is being bullied at school, takes out his frustrations on one of O'Banion's men. Charlie Luciano sits down with Masseria, who muscles a high tax on Lucky's growing business and tells him to be wary of his Jewish partners. Mickey receives a menacing phone call from Rothstein. Ignoring Nucky's instructions and Eli, not to transport liquor through Tabor Heights, leads to grave consequences.
29	5	"You'd Be Surprised"	Tim Van Patten	Diane Frolov & Andrew Schneider	October 14, 2012	2.19
Van Alden comes clean with his nanny Sigrid but this backfires when they are visited by a Prohibition agent, forcing him to return to O'Banion's place. Margaret suffers setbacks while trying to promote her Women's Health clinic. Gillian seeks Leander's counsel in financing her bordello, for which she must either change her business model or let go of the past. Nucky enlists a reluctant Eddie Cantor to help Billie move up in the world. An attempt is made on Gyp Rosetti's life.
30	6	"Ging Gang Goolie"	Ed Bianchi	Steve Kornacki	October 21, 2012	2.34
Nucky maneuvers to avoid taking a political fall for the Attorney General, getting arrested in the process. Eli and Mickey visit Tabor Heights. Richard befriends an older veteran and his daughter, Julia. Gillian takes on a young lover, who she names "James". While her son longs for a male presence in the house, Margaret rekindles an affair with Owen.
31	7	"Sunday Best"	Allen Coulter	Howard Korder	October 28, 2012	1.97
Nucky, Eli and their families bond over Easter dinner. Richard takes young Tommy to dine with the Sagorskys and Julia accepts Richard's invitation to the local Carnival. In danger of reprisal over his actions in Tabor Heights, Gyp brokers a deal with his boss, Joe Masseria. Gillian comes to murderous terms with the death of Jimmy.
32	8	"The Pony"	Tim Van Patten	Terence Winter and Howard Korder	November 4, 2012	2.09
Arrangements are made for Nucky to attend a private club, where he makes a proposal to the Secretary of the Treasury, Andrew Mellon. Torrio, back from Italy, gives Al a larger role in the business. Nelson, indebted to O'Banion, is forced to work for him after hours, while at the same time facing problems in his day job. Nucky and Billie argue about the nature of their relationship. Margaret decides to take a stand on birth control and looks for a birthday pony with Owen's help. Gillian cuts ties with Luciano, giving Gyp a tip in the process. The result is an attempt on Nucky's life in which Billie is killed in a violent explosion on the boardwalk.
33	9	"The Milkmaid's Lot"	Ed Bianchi	Rolin Jones	November 11, 2012	2.06
Taking refuge in the Ritz, a concussed and feverish Nucky struggles to be the man in charge while fighting memory lapses from the concussion, with the help of his family and closest accomplices, while they plan his next move. Gyp returns to Tabor Heights and starts his own import operation with the blessing of Joe Masseria. Richard takes Julia to a dance and Gillian blames him for Tommy's latest misadventure. George Remus is arrested for violation of the Volstead Act.
34	10	"A Man, a Plan..."	Jeremy Podeswa	Dave Flebotte	November 18, 2012	2.18
Nucky and Owen plan a move against New York, pursuing Masseria first. A middle-man who could expose both Nucky and the Attorney General is targeted. Nelson's new sales job gets him into trouble with Capone. Richard and Julia's relationship takes a step forward. After being rejected by Rothstein, Luciano and Lansky go into business with Masseria. Margaret reveals to Owen that she is pregnant with his baby but before they can run away he is killed by Masseria's men.
35	11	"Two Imposters"	Allen Coulter	Howard Korder	November 25, 2012	2.30
Gyp and his crew move into Atlantic City. Nucky goes on the run while his wife disappears with her children. Nucky and wounded Eddie turn to Chalky for help; Chalky has a stand off with Rosetti. Lansky advises Luciano to be cautious in their new heroin operation. Gillian turns on Richard, evicting him from the house. Eli brings Capone back from Chicago with him as an ally in Nucky's fight to hold onto his empire.
36	12	"Margate Sands"	Tim Van Patten	Terence Winter and Howard Korder	December 2, 2012	2.73
It's a full-scale war in Atlantic City and bodies are piling up on both sides. Based in a lumber yard, Nucky seeks to weaken the Rosetti–Masseria alliance while struggling to keep peace between Capone and Chalky. In New York, Luciano is framed by Masseria and Rothstein with the aid of fake police. Gillian makes a failed attempt to woo, drug and presumably kill Rosetti. Nucky strikes a deal with Rothstein to break Rosetti's power. Chalky and Capone's army massacre Masseria's men as they are retreating to NYC. Richard storms Gillian's house and kills many of Rosetti's men but Rosetti escapes. Nucky uses his political connections to settle a score with Rothstein. Richard gives Tommy a new home at Julia's, sacrificing his relationship with her in the process. Rosetti meets with his three remaining henchmen but on orders from Nucky, Gyp's main assistant stabs him to death while he is urinating on a beach. Nucky tracks down Margaret, who ends their relationship. A depressed Nucky walks the boardwalk where he is recognized by other pedestrians. While he is lonely, he has regained control of Atlantic City.

== Reception ==
=== Critical reception ===
The third season of Boardwalk Empire received positive reviews from critics, with Bobby Cannavale being singled out for praise. On the review aggregator website Metacritic, the third season scored 76/100 based on 15 reviews. Another aggregator website, Rotten Tomatoes, reported 89% of critics gave the third season a score of 8.7/10, based on 45 reviews, with the site consensus stating "As hot-headed mobster Gyp Rosetti, Bobby Cannavale brings a sense of danger and energy to this season of Boardwalk Empire, which remains lavish, twisty, and violent."

=== Awards and nominations ===
The third season received 10 Primetime Emmy Award nominations for the 65th Primetime Emmy Awards and won 5 altogether. Bobby Cannavale won for Outstanding Supporting Actor in a Drama Series, and the series won the awards for Outstanding Art Direction for a Single-Camera Series ("Sunday Best"), Outstanding Hairstyling for a Single-Camera Series ("Resolution"), Outstanding Sound Editing For A Series ("The Milkmaid's Lot"), and Outstanding Sound Mixing for a Comedy or Drama Series ("The Milkmaid's Lot"). Tim Van Patten was nominated for Outstanding Directing for a Drama Series for "Margate Sands", and the series also received nominations for Outstanding Cinematography for a Single-Camera Series ("Margate Sands"), Outstanding Costumes for a Series ("Resolution"), Outstanding Makeup for a Single-Camera Series (Non-Prosthetic) ("Resolution"), and Outstanding Special Visual Effects in a Supporting Role ("The Pony").
