= Blue Bell Boy =

- Boardwalk Empire episode
- Episode no.: Season 3 Episode 4
- Directed by: Kari Skogland
- Written by: David Stenn
- Cinematography by: Bill Coleman
- Editing by: Tim Streeto
- Original air date: October 7, 2012
- Running time: 56 minutes

Guest appearances
- Anatol Yusef as Meyer Lansky; Nick Robinson as Rowland Smith; Patrick Kennedy as Dr. Douglas Mason; Kerry O'Malley as Edwina Shearer; Ivo Nandi as Joe Masseria; Heather Lind as Katy; Lucas Caleb Rooney as Joe Miller

Episode chronology
← Previous "Bone for Tuna"	Next → "You'd Be Surprised"
- Boardwalk Empire (season 3)

"Blue Bell Boy" is the fourth episode of the third season of the American period crime drama television series Boardwalk Empire. It is the 28th overall episode of the series and was written by supervising producer David Stenn, and directed by Kari Skogland. It was released on HBO on October 7, 2012.

The series is set in Atlantic City, New Jersey, during the Prohibition era of the 1920s. The series follows Enoch "Nucky" Thompson, a political figure who rises to prominence and interacts with mobsters, politicians, government agents, and the common folk who look up to him. In the episode, Nucky and Owen confront a liquor thief, while Capone faces problems with his son.

According to Nielsen Media Research, the episode was seen by an estimated 2.11 million household viewers and gained a 0.9 ratings share among adults aged 18–49. The episode received mixed reviews from critics, who praised the ending but criticized the pacing and lack of character development.

== Plot ==
Nucky informs Owen and Mickey that they will now avoid Tabor Heights, instructing them to use secondary routes for Rothstein's liquor, despite winter making it difficult for the vehicles. Nucky and Owen also arrive at a house where a man named Rowland Smith stole liquor, intending to confront him whenever he returns.

In Chicago, Capone discovers that his son is being bullied at school for his deafness. Unable to seek retaliation as the school consists of deaf kids, Capone tries to teach him how to fight, but stops when he starts pushing his son too much. After learning that Dean O'Banion had a henchman beat his associate Jake Guzik, Capone brutally kills the henchman at a bar. Luciano is asked to meet with Joe Masseria to discuss his heroin distribution. Luciano offers a small share of his profits, but Masseria instead demands 30% of the profits, warning him that his Jewish associates cannot be trusted.

Nucky and Owen finally meet Rowland, who claims to be just sixteen-years-old. Suddenly, Federal agents raid the house, and they are forced into the basement to hide. Once the agents depart, Nucky makes small talk with Rowland, trying to decide what to do with him. After Rowland reveals his true age, 19, Nucky shoots him dead without warning, shocking Owen. Mickey breaks Nucky's rules and decides to send men to transport the liquor through Tabor Heights, despite Eli's protests. Eli discovers that Gyp plans to ambush the delivery and tries to warn the men, but arrives too late. The men are all killed, while Gyp takes possession of the liquor. Eli is forced to disclose the events to Nucky.

== Production ==
=== Development ===
The episode was written by supervising producer David Stenn, and directed by Kari Skogland. This was Stenn's first writing credit, and Skogland's first directing credit.

== Reception ==
=== Viewers ===
In its original American broadcast, "Blue Bell Boy" was seen by an estimated 2.11 million household viewers with a 0.9 in the 18-49 demographics. This means that 0.9 percent of all households with televisions watched the episode. This was a 11% decrease in viewership from the previous episode, which was watched by 2.36 million household viewers with a 0.9 in the 18-49 demographics.

=== Critical reviews ===
"Blue Bell Boy" received mixed reviews. Matt Fowler of IGN gave the episode a "good" 7.7 out of 10 and wrote, "I have to admit, I wasn't completely thrilled with 'Blue Bell Boy' and the whole 'last gas station in Tabor Heights' locale is getting a bit tired. But there were a few moments at the end of this chapter that seemed to pull the story back together a bit. Not enough to save the entire episode, but enough to make me appreciate going on the journey. And Al Capone singing Henry Burr's 'My Buddy' to his deaf son at the end was sickeningly touching"

Noel Murray of The A.V. Club gave the episode an "A–" grade and wrote, "I'm not going to contend that 'Blue Bell Boy' was, top-to-bottom, the strongest episode of Boardwalk Empire. It was hushed, dingy-looking, and uneventful on the surface, with the most significant action (at least in terms of the overarching plot) taking place offscreen. But after watching the episode earlier this week, I'm still haunted by the last five minutes and what it has to say about loyalty, strange bedfellows, and what Nucky has become. So I am going to contend that 'Blue Bell Boy' was the most powerful episode of this season so far, albeit quietly so."

Alan Sepinwall of HitFix wrote, "even though the circumstances are different, and Nucky seems aware of how he's viewed within the show, it's still a frustrating, repetitive kind of episode. As with the season so far, individual pieces work, but the whole of it isn't entirely satisfying, even as the Who's the Boss? theme ties most of the stories together." Seth Colter Walls of Vulture gave the episode a 2 star rating out of 5 and wrote, "It's well written and the acting is fine, but it's a straggler arc on an episode that's already carrying several of those. Missing from this episode are a lot of other more compelling characters: Richard Harrow, Gillian, Chalky White and family, plus the season's main antagonist, Gyp Rosetti, who gets basically a couple of lines. It's enough to make a viewer pipe up with some second-guessing."

Rodrigo Perez of IndieWire gave the episode a "B–" grade and wrote, "Still in first gear, still fumbling around with several story threads, but failing to make an engaging tapestry, Boardwalk Empire is still looking to gain some forward momentum this season. That's not to say the show is getting boring, as Anne Thompson said, but how long does it take to build and build to the inevitable showdown?" Chris O'Hara of TV Fanatic gave the episode a perfect 5 star rating out of 5 and wrote, "Boardwalk Empire served up one of its most delectable installments this week. While there was a little inconsistency at times with the show's main man Nucky, 'Blue Bell Boy' delivered in so many other ways that in the end it didn't really matter."

Michael Noble of Den of Geek wrote, "Boardwalk Empire has larger ambitions than simply telling the story of Capone's rise to power. Nevertheless, in this episode, 'Blue Bell Boy', Capone takes a leading role in a storyline that focuses on his family responsibilities." Michelle Rafferty of Paste gave the episode a 7 out of 10 and wrote, "The hand-wringing induced by this show isn't like waiting for the big twist on a typical procedural. Just as often as Boardwalk surprises, it sets us up to get exactly what we expect. The suspense in the latter then derives from sheer waiting."
