= Spaghetti & Coffee =

- Boardwalk Empire episode
- Episode no.: Season 3 Episode 2
- Directed by: Alik Sakharov
- Written by: Howard Korder
- Cinematography by: Bill Coleman
- Editing by: Tim Streeto
- Original air date: September 23, 2012
- Running time: 58 minutes

Guest appearances
- Stephen Root as Gaston Means; Erik LaRay Harvey as Dunn Purnsley; Meg Steedle as Billie Kent; Patrick Kennedy as Dr. Douglas Mason; Kerry O'Malley as Edwina Shearer; Glenn Fleshler as George Remus; E.J. Carroll as Sheriff Victor Sickles

Episode chronology
← Previous "Resolution"	Next → "Bone for Tuna"
- Boardwalk Empire (season 3)

"Spaghetti & Coffee" is the second episode of the third season of the American period crime drama television series Boardwalk Empire. It is the 26th overall episode of the series and was written by executive producer Howard Korder, and directed by Alik Sakharov. It was released on HBO on September 23, 2012.

The series is set in Atlantic City, New Jersey, during the Prohibition era of the 1920s. The series follows Enoch "Nucky" Thompson, a political figure who rises to prominence and interacts with mobsters, politicians, government agents, and the common folk who look up to him. In the episode, Eli is forced to work for Mickey, while Nucky faces trouble with his affair.

According to Nielsen Media Research, the episode was seen by an estimated 2.62 million household viewers and gained a 1.0 ratings share among adults aged 18–49. The episode received generally positive reviews from critics, who praised the performances, but criticized the pacing and lack of progress.

== Plot ==
Mickey picks up Eli, who was just released from prison. Eli is dismayed when informed that he now has to work for Mickey, per Nucky's instructions. However, upon seeing that his family had to adapt to a new environment in his absence, Eli reluctantly accepts to work on Nucky's terms.

In Tabor Heights, Gyp flirts with the local diner maids and meets the Sheriff with an intent to gain power over who enters and exits the town.

Chalky is approached by Samuel Crawford, who asks for his blessing in marrying his daughter, Maybelle. Chalky accepts, but becomes upset when Maybelle tells him that she is more interested in a person similar to Chalky himself, as he wants her to not get involved with a criminal. Maybelle and Samuel attend Chalky's club, where Samuel is attacked by a person. Chalky, to prove his nature, has his henchman brutally attack the man as a retaliation, shocking Maybelle.

Nucky meets with special investigator Gaston Means, who is Harry M. Daugherty's bagman in New York and asks for $40,000 for his services. His affair with Billie Kent also begins affecting the business side with Rothstein, and his domestic life with Margaret.

During a night delivery, while stopping for gas, Owen, Mickey and Eli are approached by Gyp, who refuses to allow them access to the gas pumps. This action seizes control of their transportation route, which blocks access for their deliveries to Rothstein in New York City. Owen calls Nucky about the matter, but he does not answer the phone as he is spending time with Billie. Without Nucky's approval and outnumbered, Owen, Eli and Mickey are forced to return to Atlantic City with the delivery.

== Production ==
=== Development ===
The episode was written by executive producer Howard Korder, and directed by Alik Sakharov. This was Korder's seventh writing credit, and Sakharov's first directing credit.

== Reception ==
=== Viewers ===
In its original American broadcast, "Spaghetti & Coffee" was seen by an estimated 2.62 million household viewers with a 1.0 in the 18-49 demographics. This means that 1 percent of all households with televisions watched the episode. This was a 10% decrease in viewership from the previous episode, which was watched by 2.89 million household viewers with a 1.2 in the 18-49 demographics.

=== Critical reviews ===
"Spaghetti & Coffee" received generally positive reviews. Matt Fowler of IGN gave the episode a "great" 8 out of 10 and wrote, "This episode felt a bit shallow, but perhaps that's because Nucky was busy dipping his feet in the shallow end, hoping his hummingbird wouldn't fly too far away."

Noel Murray of The A.V. Club gave the episode a "B" grade and wrote, "Unlike last week's tense 'Resolution,' I found 'Spaghetti & Coffee' more diffuse, with less narrative drive overall. Perhaps that's because the family troubles of Eli and Chalky are less interesting to me than faux-family troubles of Nucky and the Darmody clan."

Alan Sepinwall of HitFix wrote, "So we have a lot of characters so far off in their own stories, all loosely connected by Nucky, and Nucky doing his best to stay out of sight. Makes for a lot of interesting individual pieces, but we'll have to see if they come together for a satisfying whole." Seth Colter Walls of Vulture gave the episode a 4 star rating out of 5 and wrote, "It looks like Maybelle can't quite stomach this violence in the flesh. Chalky, after commanding the pianist to keep playing, stares his daughter down, asking: 'Am I interesting now?' It's enough to make the rest of the episode's various intrigues pale by comparison."

Edward Davis of IndieWire gave the episode a "B–" grade and wrote, "While chess moves were made, specifically and most dramatically in Rosetti's powerplay in Tabor Heights, as usual, Boardwalk Empire is content to move at a patient gait. A wise move in the end, but 'Spaghetti & Coffee' is the type of slow-moving episode that you immediately jump to the next episode if you're watching on DVD." Chris O'Hara of TV Fanatic gave the episode a 4 star rating out of 5 and wrote, "The walls seem to be closing in on Nucky and he seems to be searching for some distance from it all. The political issues, Gyp now interfering, not to mention the issue of Margaret giving away the land to her parish which has yet to come up, all will serve to make Nucky start asking for a little less starch in his collars I feel. Like the fish in the opening scene, Nucky's pond is shrinking and the water isn't getting any safer."

Michael Noble of Den of Geek wrote, "This was a good episode, especially as it let the personal drama do most of the talking, and gave some much-needed space to a couple of the lesser-used characters. It was a real treat to see a little of the worlds of Eli and Chalky, not least because they showed how hard it can be to struggle against your time and circumstances." Michelle Rafferty of Paste gave the episode an 8 out of 10 and wrote, "Meticulous serialization is a wonderful thing. So too, is the fragmented and free-form arc, if a show can put it together right, on both an episode and season level. Boardwalk has done an exceptional job with this in the past, and as long as it quickly brings Harrow back in, I think it'll be OK this year."
