= Sunday Best (Boardwalk Empire) =

- Boardwalk Empire episode
- Episode no.: Season 3 Episode 7
- Directed by: Allen Coulter
- Written by: Howard Korder
- Cinematography by: David Franco
- Editing by: Kate Sanford
- Original air date: October 28, 2012
- Running time: 58 minutes

Guest appearances
- Billy Magnussen as Roger McAllister; Ivo Nandi as Joe Masseria

Episode chronology
← Previous "Ging Gang Goolie"	Next → "The Pony"
- Boardwalk Empire (season 3)

"Sunday Best" is the seventh episode of the third season of the American period crime drama television series Boardwalk Empire. It is the 31st overall episode of the series and was written by executive producer Howard Korder, and directed by Allen Coulter. It was released on HBO on October 28, 2012.

The series is set in Atlantic City, New Jersey, during the Prohibition era of the 1920s. The series follows Enoch "Nucky" Thompson, a political figure who rises to prominence and interacts with mobsters, politicians, government agents, and the common folk who look up to him. In the episode, Nucky visits Eli during Easter, while Gyp returns to New York City to settle things with Masseria, and Gillian spends the day with Roger.

According to Nielsen Media Research, the episode was seen by an estimated 1.97 million household viewers and gained a 0.7 ratings share among adults aged 18–49. The episode received extremely positive reviews from critics, who praised the directing, performances and character development. For the episode, Bobby Cannavale won Outstanding Supporting Actor in a Drama Series at the 65th Primetime Emmy Awards.

== Plot ==
During Easter Sunday, Nucky and Margaret take their family to visit Eli at his house. However, Eli is still mad at Nucky for his perceived lack of progress by working for him. Speaking with him privately in his garage, Eli gives him a pistol, asking Nucky to kill him, which Nucky refuses to do. The day proceeds largely pleasantly, but June is surprised when Margaret reveals Nucky's affair with Billie to her in a private moment between them. After a talk with Margaret, Nucky decides to promote Eli as co-leader of the warehouse.

Gillian feigns sickness and asks Richard to take Tommy with him. She then spends the day with Roger at the Artemis Club, during which they have sex. Later, she brings him to a special bathtub where she starts bathing him. However, she surprises him by injecting him with a lethal dose of heroin. Roger slowly dies in the bathtub, with Gillian putting Jimmy's dog tag on his neck.

In New York City, Gyp Rosetti is stressed not only because of the assassination attempt but also because his profits are plummeting. He then reluctantly joins his wife and her family in an Easter dinner, where it is clear that they do not respect him. He later goes to church, reprimanding God for everything bad that happened to him. When a priest approaches him, Gyp brutally beats him and robs the church. He then meets with Joe Masseria, with Masseria not hiding his disdain for Gyp, claiming he cannot trust him anymore and prepares to kill him. Gyp, in an attempt to save his own life, then offers to kill Nucky, Rothstein, Luciano and their associates. Although skeptical, Masseria gives him his blessing.

Richard takes Tommy with him to the Sagorskys' house as Julia invited him to dine. However, Paul has been drinking and displays his abusive nature to his family. Tensions escalate when Paul scolds Tommy for sneaking into his dead son's bedroom. When Richard threatens to kill him for harming Tommy, Paul orders him to leave his house. Richard convinces Julia to get out of the house and join him and Tommy at a carnival on the boardwalk. That night, he returns to the Artemis Club, where he is visited by Gillian, who has finally accepted that Jimmy died. Women find Roger's body, screams are heard, and Richard leaves the room to check, while Gillian stays behind, sobbing.

== Production ==
=== Development ===
The episode was written by executive producer Howard Korder, and directed by Allen Coulter. This was Korder's eighth writing credit, and Coulter's fifth directing credit.

== Reception ==
=== Viewers ===
In its original American broadcast, "Sunday Best" was seen by an estimated 1.97 million household viewers with a 0.7 in the 18-49 demographics. This means that 0.7 percent of all households with televisions watched the episode. This was a 16% decrease in viewership from the previous episode, which was watched by 2.34 million household viewers with a 0.8 in the 18-49 demographics.

=== Critical reviews ===
"Sunday Best" received extremely positive reviews. Matt Fowler of IGN gave the episode a "great" 8 out of 10 and wrote, "While still in recoil mode, Boardwalk gave us another slow episode with 'Sunday Best' - but a much more engaging one than 'Ging Gang Goolie.' Last week's look at Margaret, Teddy and the gypsy fire was a shaky, but this week's Thompson family dinner provided many great, small moments of both reconciliation and refusal. Plus, we had some movement, albeit not earth-shaking, in the lives of Gillian, Harrow and Gyp."

Noel Murray of The A.V. Club gave the episode an "A" grade and wrote, "'Sunday Best' was written by playwright Howard Korder and directed by one of the core Sopranos helmers, Allen Coulter, both of whom have been major contributors to Boardwalk Empire over the course of the first two-and-a-half seasons. I'm not sure that either of them have ever done better work on this show than they do in this episode, which is so full of flavorful dialogue and subtly effective staging that I almost don't know where to begin citing examples of how good it is. Usually, I talk about the quality of Boardwalk Empire's individual scenes, and say that it doesn't always matter if they amount to anything. Well, every scene in 'Sunday Best' is precisely measured and mesmerizing, and it all comes together beautifully."

Alan Sepinwall of HitFix wrote, "Overall, though, 'Sunday Best' was among season 3's most satisfying outings, even as it largely set the big story arcs aside so everyone could say a prayer and enjoy the holiday." Seth Colter Walls of Vulture gave the episode a 4 star rating out of 5 and wrote, "This Eli! Such a sweet, sensitive family guy. So, it's to be a special holiday episode of Boardwalk Empire, then? The surprise is that, even if a little light on shoot-outs and the traditional points of conflict between gangsters that this show thrives on, this episode delivers on a lot of fronts."

Rodrigo Perez of IndieWire gave the episode a "B+" grade and wrote, "These after effects are still rippling outward, but the curiously involving 'Sunday Best' takes a sharp detour from these plot points, which will rule the rest of the season, in favor of a quieter, character-driven episode that lets all of its players interact. And while we've complained in the past about a lack of momentum, this chamber piece is Boardwalk Empire at its best — be patient, as good things are coming to those who wait." Chris O'Hara of TV Fanatic gave the episode a 4.1 star rating out of 5 and wrote, "I obviously didn't get to see much of the Gyp character, but I was really intrigued by his scene in the church. I had wondered where he was going to use his suit if not for Easter dinner, and it was fitting that such an unhappy man would take it out on God, and then take from the man he thought was responsible for his lot in life."

Michael Noble of Den of Geek wrote, "Boardwalk Empire has a surfeit of great characters, too many to fit fully into a single episode, but all worth looking at in detail. It's good then, that after last week's deft handling of the season's plot elements, we got a nice suite of character studies this week. The Thompson brothers, Margaret, Rosetti, Harrow and Gillian each took some precious screen time to reveal a little bit more of themselves." Michelle Rafferty of Paste gave the episode a 9 out of 10 and wrote, "The end of this episode left me with familiar feelings for Gillian: part sorry, part horrified. Her tears for Harrow felt genuine. At the same time I got chills wondering how calculated her plan was."

=== Accolades ===
Bobby Cannavale submitted the episode to support his Outstanding Supporting Actor in a Drama Series nomination at the 65th Primetime Emmy Awards. He would win the award, becoming the first and only actor of the series to win an Emmy.
