= The Milkmaid's Lot =

- Boardwalk Empire episode
- Episode no.: Season 3 Episode 9
- Directed by: Ed Bianchi
- Written by: Rolin Jones
- Cinematography by: David Franco
- Editing by: Kate Sanford
- Original air date: November 11, 2012
- Running time: 53 minutes

Guest appearances
- Julianne Nicholson as Esther Randolph; Anatol Yusef as Meyer Lansky; Meg Steedle as Billie Kent; Glenn Fleshler as George Remus; Ivo Nandi as Joe Masseria; Kevin O'Rourke as Edward L. Bader; Nick Sandow as Waxey Gordon; Victor Verhaeghe as Damien Fleming

Episode chronology
← Previous "The Pony"	Next → "A Man, a Plan..."
- Boardwalk Empire (season 3)

"The Milkmaid's Lot" is the ninth episode of the third season of the American period crime drama television series Boardwalk Empire. It is the 33rd overall episode of the series and was written by co-executive producer Rolin Jones, and directed by Ed Bianchi. It was released on HBO on November 11, 2012.

The series is set in Atlantic City, New Jersey, during the Prohibition era of the 1920s. The series follows Enoch "Nucky" Thompson, a political figure who rises to prominence and interacts with mobsters, politicians, government agents, and the common folk who look up to him. In the episode, Nucky recovers from his assassination attempt, while Richard gets into a conflict with Gillian.

According to Nielsen Media Research, the episode was seen by an estimated 2.06 million household viewers and gained a 0.7 ratings share among adults aged 18–49. The episode received generally positive reviews from critics, who praised the performances and character development, while the pacing received criticism.

== Plot ==
Nucky recovers at the Ritz Carlton from the bombing. Due to his proximity to the explosion, he now suffers tinnitus and struggles in differentiating reality from hallucination. Margaret is forced to relocate Emily's birthday to the Ritz, much to her chagrin.

Gyp brutally assaults Sheriff Ramsey for his failure in Tabor Heights. He later tells the citizens that they will each be paid $200 monthly for their services, effectively putting them on his payroll. He later calls a still dazed and confused Nucky to mock him about Billie's death, causing Nucky to have a mental breakdown at his office. He tells Eli and Owen that he wants the cooperation of their associates to kill both Gyp and Joe Masseria. They inform him that the men will not support Nucky with his condition, with Torrio refusing to be part of his plans.

George Remus is arrested by Treasury agents in Cincinnati. When confronted by Randolph, he seeks a pardon through giving information about Jess Smith, who is in Daugherty's pocket. Richard continues seeing Julia, and both go dancing at an American Legion meeting, where she kisses him. Due to Richard's absence, Tommy spends the day with one of Gillian's workers. While looking for her, Tommy sees her having sex with a man in a room. When Richard returns to the Artemis Club, Gillian scolds him for prioritizing his life over Tommy's life.

Nucky finds an earring in the bathroom and gives it to Margaret. However, Margaret does not recognize it, as it actually belonged to Billie. He eventually accepts that her death is his fault. During the meeting with his associates, Nucky proposes going to war to kill Gyp and Masseria. However, Rothstein reveals that the associates all discussed the situation already, and they concluded they do not want to face Masseria. They wish him good luck with his plans, leaving Nucky to carry it out all by himself. In Tabor Heights, the citizens prepare a liquor shipment, under Gyp's supervision.

== Production ==
=== Development ===
The episode was written by co-executive producer Rolin Jones, and directed by Ed Bianchi. This was Jones' first writing credit, and Bianchi's third directing credit.

== Reception ==
=== Viewers ===
In its original American broadcast, "The Milkmaid's Lot" was seen by an estimated 2.06 million household viewers with a 0.7 in the 18-49 demographics. This means that 0.7 percent of all households with televisions watched the episode. This was a slight decrease in viewership from the previous episode, which was watched by 2.09 million household viewers with a 0.7 in the 18-49 demographics.

=== Critical reviews ===
"The Milkmaid's Lot" received generally positive reviews from critics. Matt Fowler of IGN gave the episode a "good" 7.7 out of 10 and wrote, "Overall, this episode felt like a ton of set up for more exciting things to come, all while having the final members of Nucky's family and friends move closer to abandoning him completely."

Noel Murray of The A.V. Club gave the episode an "A–" grade and wrote, "When Nucky dreams or hallucinates, he tends to say and see things that speak to his circumstances in ways that are, well, a little on the nose. But I'm going to continue to refrain from leveling that particular criticism at 'The Milkmaid's Lot,' and not just because I think the phrase is played-out. I'm also holding back, because even though Nucky's severe confusion leads to him spilling his guts literally and figuratively, and the whole 'unfiltered Nucky' element in 'The Milkmaid's Lot' also provokes one intense, nerve-wrackingly dramatic scene after another."

Alan Sepinwall of HitFix wrote, "Nucky Thompson is a man who craves respect, but he needs love, too, and he's put himself in a position this season where both are in short supply." Seth Colter Walls of Vulture gave the episode a 3 star rating out of 5 and wrote, "Gyp's outsized sense of himself is both foolhardy and interesting. And the type of intellectual insecurity he exhibits is not something that Boardwalk Empire has typically rewarded. Last season, the intellectually defensive one was Eli; look how that turned out for him. Nucky, once he regains his health, will still be smarter than Gyp, even if he doesn't have the muscle of his fair-weather friends. Resolving that tension should prove more exciting than the scattered portions of this episode."

Edward Davis of IndieWire wrote, "Livid, Nucky can do nothing, but accept their decision, but he's now put his cards on the table — Masseria knows his intentions — and is left holding his dick, essentially." Chris O'Hara of TV Fanatic gave the episode a 4 star rating out of 5 and wrote, "We certainly have not seen the last of the Manhattan boys or the Chi-town twosome of Torrio and Capone. For now, though, it seems the stage is set for a one on one grudge match by the sea."

Michael Noble of Den of Geek wrote, "It was handled superbly, both in terms of Steve Buscemi's performance and it being placed in the context of the episode's key plot movements. The slipping between realities was dizzying to watch, funny and tragic at turns. The confusion was held together wonderfully by Buscemi, who managed to convey menace and pathos in the right amounts." Michelle Rafferty of Paste gave the episode an 8 out of 10 and wrote, "This season has been chock-full of gobsmacking conclusions. Gyp sets a person on fire. Gillian draws a deadly bath. The Boardwalk explodes. Bobby Cannavale bares all, internet swoons, etc. True to form, last night's denouement delivered a shocker, but this time of the less graphic variety: Nucky tells his wife the truth. And it only took losing his wits to get him there."
