= Two Imposters =

- Boardwalk Empire episode
- Episode no.: Season 3 Episode 11
- Directed by: Allen Coulter
- Written by: Howard Korder
- Cinematography by: David Franco
- Editing by: Kate Sanford
- Original air date: November 25, 2012
- Running time: 49 minutes

Guest appearances
- Anatol Yusef as Meyer Lansky; Erik LaRay Harvey as Dunn Purnsley; Ty Michael Robinson as Samuel Crawford; Nick Wyman as Dr. Robert Landau

Episode chronology
← Previous "A Man, a Plan..."	Next → "Margate Sands"
- Boardwalk Empire (season 3)

"Two Imposters" is the eleventh episode of the third season of the American period crime drama television series Boardwalk Empire. It is the 35th overall episode of the series and was written by executive producer Howard Korder, and directed by Allen Coulter. It was released on HBO on November 25, 2012.

The series is set in Atlantic City, New Jersey, during the Prohibition era of the 1920s. The series follows Enoch "Nucky" Thompson, a political figure who rises to prominence and interacts with mobsters, politicians, government agents, and the common folk who look up to him. In the episode, Nucky goes on the run when Gyp Rosetti sends hitmen after him.

According to Nielsen Media Research, the episode was seen by an estimated 2.30 million household viewers and gained a 0.8 ratings share among adults aged 18–49. The episode received universal acclaim from critics, who praised the directing, writing, performances, build-up and tension, and is considered one of the best episodes of the series.

== Plot ==
In the morning, Nucky is informed by Eddie that Margaret has left with her children. Suddenly, their suite is attacked by Gyp's hitmen. Nucky and Eddie manage to fend them off and escape in a car, although Eddie is revealed to have been shot.

In New York City, Charlie Luciano and Meyer Lansky prepare to make a heroin deal with two men. Lansky is worried about their possible association with Nucky, especially after discovering Owen's death, but Luciano brushes it off. However, the two men are revealed to be police officers, and Luciano is arrested during the exchange.

Richard returns to the Artemis Club, to find Gillian awaiting him. She is not delighted with his absences, warning him that it won't do him any good. The Artemis Club is also suddenly made a headquarters for Gyp's crew, annoying Gillian. She also discovers Richard planning to leave with Tommy, with the latter confessing they are going with Julia. She fires Richard and evicts him from the Artemis Club. In his room, Richard prepares his gun collection.

Nucky and Eddie flee to Chalky's territory at Chicken Bone Beach, asking for asylum. Chalky initially declines but agrees to let him stay after seeing Eddie's wound. Nucky is then forced to help Chalky's future son-in-law Samuel, an aspiring doctor, in Eddie's emergency surgery, just as Gyp arrives with his men. Gyp offers a large sum of money to Chalky if he gives him Nucky. Gyp attempts to enter his house and to entice Chalky's men to give Nucky up to him, until Chalky intimidates him into walking away.

That night, Chalky helps Nucky escape Atlantic City by hiding him in a truck. After killing some of Gyp's hitmen at a road block who again attempt to assassinate him, Nucky decides to abandon his plan to leave Atlantic City. Chalky gets Nucky back to Atlantic City, settling into a lumberyard where Eli's son works. Nucky convinces Chalky to help him in fighting Gyp, promising him a new club on the boardwalk to replace the now-destroyed Babette's. Suddenly, Eli arrives with new backup from Chicago. Instead of getting Torrio, he convinced Capone to help them in their war against Gyp.

== Production ==
=== Development ===
The episode was written by executive producer Howard Korder, and directed by Allen Coulter. This was Korder's tenth writing credit, and Coulter's sixth directing credit.

== Reception ==
=== Viewers ===
In its original American broadcast, "Two Imposters" was seen by an estimated 2.30 million household viewers with a 0.8 in the 18-49 demographics. This means that 0.8 percent of all households with televisions watched the episode. This was a 5% increase in viewership from the previous episode, which was watched by 2.18 million household viewers with a 0.8 in the 18-49 demographics.

=== Critical reviews ===
"Two Imposters" received universal acclaim. Matt Fowler of IGN gave the episode an "amazing" 9.5 out of 10 and wrote, "'Two Imposters,' which was named after the poetic mirage-effect of triumph and disaster that Eddie was muttering about in German, was a very focused and very suspenseful episode that represented some of the best work that this series has ever done."

Noel Murray of The A.V. Club gave the episode an "A" grade and wrote, "There are a number of reasons why 'Two Imposters' is one of the most exciting Boardwalk Empire episodes of the entire series, but the primary reason is that it's relatively compact."

Alan Sepinwall of HitFix wrote, "'Two Imposters' is among the season's shorter episodes, clocking in just under 50 minutes, yet it builds so much on what's happened over the previous 10 hours that it felt much denser, and more satisfying than all that had come before it. Ideally, that's the way the HBO drama model should work, and it's nice to see it happening here, drawing together a season that seemed in danger of flying off into a dozen directions only a few weeks ago." Seth Colter Walls of Vulture gave the episode a perfect 5 star rating out of 5 and wrote, "I wonder if any of the show's most loyal fans would bother denying that there are weird, unedifying stretches of languor, and curious spans of time spent introducing minor characters. But even if you've found yourself frustrated with the storytelling in this season, the consequence of back-loading the overall drama has at least one structural benefit: an hour as compelling and compact as 'Two Imposters.'"

Rodrigo Perez of IndieWire wrote, "Like an electric jolt, the riveting 'Two Imposters' takes off like a shot, is a nail-biter throughout, and leaves the audience breathless by the end." Chris O'Hara of TV Fanatic gave the episode a 3.8 star rating out of 5 and wrote, "With just one episode remaining, this mostly was a set up episode, but that in itself was not what kept me from giving a higher rating. Gillian was more painful than ever. I was even shocked to find myself growing tired of Gyp's routine: 'I'm pitching my tent hi-ho!'" Michael Noble of Den of Geek wrote, "Wow. What a zinger. That was a brilliant episode. Efficient, thrilling and tense, taking us forward to an explosive finale but with enough gas in the tank to teach us more about Nucky and for him to learn more about himself. It was the stand-out episode of the season, and one of the best that the show has ever delivered."
