= Bone for Tuna =

- Boardwalk Empire episode
- Episode no.: Season 3 Episode 3
- Directed by: Jeremy Podeswa
- Written by: Chris Haddock
- Cinematography by: David Franco
- Editing by: Kate Sanford
- Original air date: September 30, 2012
- Running time: 55 minutes

Guest appearances
- Anatol Yusef as Meyer Lansky; Meg Steedle as Billie Kent; Patrick Kennedy as Dr. Douglas Mason; Kevin O'Rourke as Edward L. Bader; Victor Verhaeghe as Damien Fleming; Michael Cumpsty as Priest Ed Brennan; E.J. Carroll as Sheriff Victor Sickles

Episode chronology
← Previous "Spaghetti & Coffee"	Next → "Blue Bell Boy"
- Boardwalk Empire (season 3)

"Bone for Tuna" is the third episode of the third season of the American period crime drama television series Boardwalk Empire. It is the 27th overall episode of the series and was written by co-executive producer Chris Haddock, and directed by Jeremy Podeswa. It was released on HBO on September 30, 2012.

The series is set in Atlantic City, New Jersey, during the Prohibition era of the 1920s. The series follows Enoch "Nucky" Thompson, a political figure who rises to prominence and interacts with mobsters, politicians, government agents, and the common folk who look up to him. In the episode, Nucky seeks to form a deal with Gyp, while Van Alden faces problems in Chicago.

According to Nielsen Media Research, the episode was seen by an estimated 2.36 million household viewers and gained a 0.9 ratings share among adults aged 18–49. The episode received positive reviews from critics, who praised the performances (particularly Bobby Cannavale) and character development.

== Plot ==
Nucky is haunted by recurring nightmares, just as he must attend a ceremony in his honor from the Catholic Church for his donation. He decides to skip the ceremony, and instead meets with Gyp in Tabor Heights to discuss the problem with the transportation routes. To earn his trust, Nucky decides to supply him with liquor and invites him back to Atlantic City.

Luciano assigns one of his henchmen, Benjamin Siegel, to lead a heroin deal. However, the deal goes awry when Siegel is almost killed in an assassination attempt ordered by Joe Masseria. Luciano also refuses to continue financially helping Gillian's club, as he feels there is no good return on investment in the Artemis Club. She is later visited by Gyp, with whom she shares history. Nucky eventually attends the church ceremony with Margaret, but continues seeing hallucinations, as well as remembering moments with Jimmy. At the reception, Margaret once again brings up the concept of a women's health clinic to the Bishop, catching his interest.

In Chicago, Van Alden continues struggling as a salesman, and must also tolerate his co-workers, who often play jokes on him. He is invited by his co-workers to a speakeasy after hours, which he accepts. As the co-workers continue mocking him, the place is raided by authorities. One of the officers recognizes Van Alden as a neighbor and decides to let him go after taking some of his money.

While tending bar, Richard is informed by a man that Mickey claims to have killed Manny Horvitz. Upset, Richard sneaks into his apartment to hold him at gunpoint. He brings him to Nucky's office to confess his deception, confirming that Richard himself killed Manny to avenge Angela. He reiterates that despite the confession, he will not pursue Nucky. Due to this, Nucky misses a meeting with Gyp to give him his supply. He instead leaves him a note that reads "bone for tuna", which is a reference to a previous conversation they had when Gyp wished him "buona fortuna." Gyp feels insulted, and burns the Sheriff of Tabor Heights alive when he reprimands him for smoking near a gas station. Nucky visits Billie Kent's apartment and decides to sleep when she is not home. He wakes up the following morning, finding her making bacon.

== Production ==
=== Development ===
The episode was written by co-executive producer Chris Haddock, and directed by Jeremy Podeswa. This was Haddock's first writing credit, and Podeswa's fourth directing credit.

== Reception ==
=== Viewers ===
In its original American broadcast, "Bone for Tuna" was seen by an estimated 2.36 million household viewers with a 0.9 in the 18-49 demographics. This means that 0.9 percent of all households with televisions watched the episode. This was a 10% decrease in viewership from the previous episode, which was watched by 2.62 million household viewers with a 1.0 in the 18-49 demographics.

=== Critical reviews ===
"Bone for Tuna" received positive reviews. Matt Fowler of IGN gave the episode a "great" 8.2 out of 10 and wrote, "So after three episodes, this has really become Bobby Cannavale's season. And let's face it, in 'Bone for Tuna,' we all knew there was no way Rosetti was leaving Atlantic City, for the second time, as anything other than bitter and angry. No matter how much Nucky tried to repair their working relationship. As Nucky put it so well, Rosetti could find an 'insult in a bouquet of roses.' And Cannavale is just crushing it."

Noel Murray of The A.V. Club gave the episode a "B+" grade and wrote, "In fact, this episode as a whole seemed more on-point than last week's, even though at this stage of the season, there's still a lot of jumping between disparate characters, as their stories move toward points that seem fairly inevitable."

Alan Sepinwall of HitFix wrote, "It's yet another power play by Gyp, in an episode full of people seizing control of a situation, often through subterfuge, or by usurping someone else's identity." Seth Colter Walls of Vulture gave the episode a 3 star rating out of 5 and wrote, "The dream stuff, though, as an organizing conceit, didn't seem particularly useful or amazing in this episode. To be sure, the cheek-gunshot-stigmata blond kid showed up in the chorus later on, during Nucky's Catholic Church swearing-in as a knight commander. But the gravity of Nucky's supposed torment in that scene is somewhat undercut by the fact that his chief announced discomfort at that moment is a suit that fits too tightly. So the child-as-grand-signifier was muddled in the episode."

Edward Davis of IndieWire wrote, "While nothing has 'happened' yet per se, chess pieces are being laid. With Rossetti reneging on their arrangement, it seems Nucky and the Sicilian gangster are going to come to blows soon." Chris O'Hara of TV Fanatic gave the episode a 4 star rating out of 5 and wrote, "While I was disappointed not to get a second helping of Chalky this week, I did like seeing the Lucky/Lansky storyline advance. How about Meyer showing he is as good a shot as he is smart? He certainly was smart to decide to cut Masseria in on the heroin business but unfortunately never got a chance to do so."

Michael Noble of Den of Geek wrote, "Despite the lengthy plotting and theme-setting in relation to Prohibition and the changes that were wrought on America during the 1920s, Boardwalk Empire is still a show that focuses on the motivation of the characters and their relationships with each other and with the world they inhabit." Michelle Rafferty of Paste gave the episode a 9 out of 10 and wrote, "Needless to say, this episode was another Nucky/Gyp-centric piece, further setting the tableau of distracted overlord and his unhinged former underling, the greater of two evils."
