= A Man, a Plan... =

- Boardwalk Empire episode
- Episode no.: Season 3 Episode 10
- Directed by: Jeremy Podeswa
- Written by: David Flebotte
- Cinematography by: Bill Coleman
- Editing by: Tim Streeto
- Original air date: November 18, 2012
- Running time: 57 minutes

Guest appearances
- Stephen Root as Gaston Means; Christopher McDonald as Harry M. Daugherty; Anatol Yusef as Meyer Lansky; Ed Jewett as Jess Smith; Patrick Kennedy as Dr. Douglas Mason; Heather Lind as Katy; Ivo Nandi as Joe Masseria; Kevin O'Rourke as Edward L. Bader; Victor Verhaeghe as Damien Fleming

Episode chronology
← Previous "The Milkmaid's Lot"	Next → "Two Imposters"
- Boardwalk Empire season 3

"A Man, a Plan..." is the tenth episode of the third season of the American period crime drama television series Boardwalk Empire. It is the 34th overall episode of the series and was written by David Flebotte, and directed by Jeremy Podeswa. It was released on HBO on November 18, 2012.

The series is set in Atlantic City, New Jersey, during the Prohibition era of the 1920s. The series follows Enoch "Nucky" Thompson, a political figure who rises to prominence and interacts with mobsters, politicians, government agents, and the common folk who look up to him. In the episode, Nucky asks Means to take care of Jess Smith, who has incriminating evidence. Meanwhile, Richard gets into a fight with Paul, and Margaret and Owen plan to run away.

According to Nielsen Media Research, the episode was seen by an estimated 2.18 million household viewers and gained a 0.8 ratings share among adults aged 18–49. The episode received generally positive reviews from critics, who praised the performances and ending, although some felt that the story arcs arrived too late for the season.

== Plot ==
Richard, Julia and Tommy spend a day at the beach, where the crowd is delighted to discover liquor bottles in the sea. The bottles are revealed to belong to Gyp, who lost two dozen crates. Franco, the cousin of Gyp's right-hand man Tonino Sandrelli, insists continually that rogue waves are to blame for the lost crates. An irate Gyp brutally kills him on the beach in front of Tonino and many of his other men, shocking them with his cruelty and leaving Tonino devastated after begging Gyp to spare his cousin's life.

Means informs Nucky that Jess Smith will provide incriminating evidence against them to the authorities. He offers to kill Smith for a $40,000 fee, which Nucky accepts. Unbeknownst to Nucky, Means also informs Daugherty that Smith cannot be trusted. He gives him the same offer as Nucky, walking away with $80,000 from both men. That night, he sneaks into Smith's apartment, only to discover Smith already awaiting him. To Means' surprise, Smith decides to shoot himself in the head, after which Means quietly leaves.

In Chicago, Van Alden is taken by men working for Capone. Capone accuses him of selling liquor in his territory. Suspecting him of working for O'Banion, Capone demands information. Back in Atlantic City, Richard gets into a conflict with Paul, who disapproves of his relationship with Julia. Richard and Julia spend the rest of the night at the beach, where they kiss.

Margaret and Owen plan to run away from their lives in Atlantic City, intending to move to St. Louis. As Nucky will suspect them if they flee together, they agree to run away with a period of weeks between their departures to avoid suspicion. Before this, Owen is informed about Joe Masseria's location. He decides to face and kill him, despite Nucky's concern that he will have no backup outside of Agent Sawicki. At the same time, Lansky and Luciano meet with Masseria, as Rothstein has declined to get involved in the heroin business. Masseria declines as well, but changes his mind when they mention that Nucky will try to kill him.

That night, a crate arrives at Nucky's room at the Ritz. After opening it, Nucky and Margaret are horrified to discover Owen's corpse inside. A devastated Margaret cries, making Nucky realize that she was having an affair with Owen. A flashback shows Margaret planning to run away with Owen. During their conversation, Margaret reveals that she is pregnant with his baby. Called by Nucky, Owen leaves the room.

== Production ==
=== Development ===
The episode was written by Dave Flebotte, and directed by Jeremy Podeswa. This was Flebotte's second writing credit, and Podeswa's fifth directing credit.

== Reception ==
=== Viewers ===
In its original American broadcast, "A Man, a Plan..." was seen by an estimated 2.18 million household viewers with a 0.8 in the 18-49 demographics. This means that 0.8 percent of all households with televisions watched the episode. This was a 5% increase in viewership from the previous episode, which was watched by 2.06 million household viewers with a 0.7 in the 18-49 demographics.

=== Critical reviews ===
"A Man, a Plan..." received generally positive reviews from critics. Matt Fowler of IGN gave the episode a "good" 7.8 out of 10 and wrote, "After hitting what I thought was an all-time rock bottom for Nucky last week, I don't think I was expecting him to still be scrambling so much in 'A Man, a Plan' - an episode that delivered a big, character subtracting moment for the series while still feeling like more set up for the final two episodes of the season. The intrigue is still in place, and I enjoy spending time with most of the characters, but the pot has more than bubbled over by now."

Noel Murray of The A.V. Club gave the episode a "B+" grade and wrote, "'A Man, A Plan...' is mostly a very strong episode, with major events transpiring, and real weight and meaning ascribed to those events. But coming so late in the season, so close to the finale, there's also a lot of channel-flipping involved, as the episode checks in on the various subplots, without really advancing them much."

Alan Sepinwall of HitFix wrote, "Boardwalk Empire isn't exactly The Wire, and yet I can't help but start waiting for the other shoe to drop whenever a character I like has too long a run of good fortune. Even factoring in the fight with Sagorsky, things are going too well for Richard and Julia, and I fear something or someone bad is going to screw everything up." Seth Colter Walls of Vulture gave the episode a 2 star rating out of 5 and wrote, "Boardwalk Empire finally turned the trick: It brought just about all of its narrative threads under the roof of a single episode during this hour. It also doubled-down on the narrative and editing 'gotcha' device that I hated earlier this season, and it felt even more bush league this time around."

Rodrigo Perez of IndieWire wrote, "It's as tragic and as brutal an ending we've seen in the history of the show. And if Boardwalk Empire took its time earlier in the season, it's now on a full-speed course to some kind of major collision that will likely leave few standing." Chris O'Hara of TV Fanatic gave the episode a perfect 5 star rating out of 5 and wrote, "Two episodes of Boardwalk Empire Season 3 remain, but it will be difficult for the either to top 'A Man, A Plan.' It had just about everything a fan of the show's heart could desire, as nearly every major character was featured."

Michael Noble of Den of Geek wrote, "Now, as we approach the final stages of the third season, a sense of escalation and of linking plot strands becomes necessary. Episode ten, 'A Man, A Plan...' delivers. I was impressed by how gently it treats the escalation; there is a return to violence, but in singular events rather than the massacres that are surely to come before the season is out." Michelle Rafferty of Paste gave the episode an 8 out of 10 and wrote, "All season it's been easy to ignore Lucky and Lansky, the kids with some 'cute' business ambitions of their own, but now, fresh off Nucky's failed gangster-dream-team-summit, they have just the ammo they need to get their heroin op afloat and shake this war to the core."
