= Resolution (Boardwalk Empire) =

- Boardwalk Empire episode
- Episode no.: Season 3 Episode 1
- Directed by: Tim Van Patten
- Written by: Terence Winter
- Cinematography by: David Franco
- Editing by: Kate Sanford
- Original air date: September 16, 2012
- Running time: 56 minutes

Guest appearances
- William Forsythe as Munya "Manny" Horvitz; Christopher McDonald as Harry M. Daugherty; Anatol Yusef as Meyer Lansky; Greg Antonacci as Johnny Torrio; Meg Steedle as Billie Kent; Stephen DeRosa as Eddie Cantor; Kevin O'Rourke as Edward L. Bader; Victor Verhaeghe as Damien Fleming; Arron Shiver as Dean O'Banion; Patrick Kennedy as Dr. Douglas Mason; Michael Cumpsty as Priest Ed Brennan; Glenn Fleshler as George Remus; Lucas Caleb Rooney as Joe Miller

Episode chronology
← Previous "To the Lost"	Next → "Spaghetti & Coffee"
- Boardwalk Empire (season 3)

"Resolution" is the first episode of the third season of the American period crime drama television series Boardwalk Empire. It is the 25th overall episode of the series and was written by series creator Terence Winter, and directed by executive producer Tim Van Patten. It was released on HBO on September 16, 2012.

The series is set in Atlantic City, New Jersey, during the Prohibition era of the 1920s. The series follows Enoch "Nucky" Thompson, a political figure who rises to prominence and interacts with mobsters, politicians, government agents, and the common folk who look up to him. In the episode, Nucky celebrates New Year with a party thrown by Margaret, just as he gets involved with Sicilian mobster Gyp Rosetti.

According to Nielsen Media Research, the episode was seen by an estimated 2.89 million household viewers and gained a 1.2 ratings share among adults aged 18–49. The episode received critical acclaim, who praised the performances and new characters, particularly Gyp Rosetti.

== Plot ==
In Tabor Heights, New Jersey, Sicilian mobster Gyp Rosetti gets upset over his car's malfunction. As his crew tries to repair it, a man stops by and suggests another method. Taking the advice as an insult, Gyp kills the man with a tire iron.

On New Year's Eve 1922, Nucky has Manny Horvitz execute a man for stealing from Mickey's warehouse. Margaret also prepares a New Year's Eve party with an Egyptian-theme. Gillian now leads a brothel, the Artemis Club, and has Richard take care of Tommy. However, Richard notes that Tommy is considering Gillian to be his mother, so he tries to have him know more about Angela. Aware of his plans, Gillian asks Richard to stop mentioning Angela to Tommy. That night, Richard corners Manny at his house, and kills him with a shotgun in front of his wife to avenge the deaths of Jimmy and Angela.

Van Alden now lives in Chicago under the name George Mueller, working as a clothing iron salesman and raising his children with Sigrid, his wife. He tries to win a $500 contest at his office to sell the most irons, but struggles in convincing people in buying them. He visits Dean O'Banion at his flower shop, just as his rival Al Capone threatens O'Banion for an earlier remark towards his deaf son. Van Alden's presence prompts Capone to leave. A grateful O'Banion not only gives him free flowers, but also buys 24 irons, which is enough to give Van Alden the win at the contest. However, he is disappointed when his boss claims the cutoff time passed by the time he reached the offices.

At the New Year's party, Nucky meets Gyp, who has taken the dog belonging to the man he killed with the tire iron. Gyp wants a shipment of rum, but Nucky states he will only supply alcohol to Rothstein. Gyp is offended by the deal, launches into a loud & abrasive verbal tirade of insults against nearly everyone in the room, and leaves the party just as the clock hits midnight. Nucky is also annoyed to discover that Margaret asked a doctor for a women's clinic at the hospital, telling her to not get him involved. He then leaves for a hotel suite, where he has sex with Billie Kent, one of the performers at the party. In the morning, Margaret goes to the beach, where she sees aviatrix Carrie Duncan start a transcontinental flight.

== Production ==
=== Development ===
The episode was written by series creator Terence Winter, and directed by executive producer Tim Van Patten. This was Winter's seventh writing credit, and Van Patten's ninth directing credit.

== Reception ==
=== Viewers ===
In its original American broadcast, "Resolution" was seen by an estimated 2.89 million household viewers with a 1.2 in the 18-49 demographics. This means that 1.2 percent of all households with televisions watched the episode. This was a 4% decrease in viewership from the previous episode, which was watched by 3.01 million household viewers with a 1.3 in the 18-49 demographics.

=== Critical reviews ===
"Resolution" received critical acclaim. Matt Fowler of IGN gave the episode a "great" 8.5 out of 10 and wrote, "From 'Resolution,' we can assume perhaps that Nucky's now in Gyp Rosetti's line of fire and that Attorney General Harry Daugherty's corruption hearings will play a factor going forward, but not much else. Will Nucky actually be the one to further instigate, blaming Rosetti for Manny's death? With his new killer-sheen, it's hard to imagine him not blindly retaliating."

Noel Murray of The A.V. Club gave the episode an "A–" grade and wrote, "What I especially liked about Resolution is that it doesn't work too hard to fill in the gaps of what’s happened since Nucky killed Jimmy, and since Margaret signed a good chunk of Nucky's property over to the church. Partly we can surmise that not much of note has transpired, beyond a brief mourning period and further consolidations of power. What we mainly need to know is that some key relationships have been affected by what happened in the season-two finale."

Alan Sepinwall of HitFix wrote, "'Resolution' is a very assured premiere. Though I have some issues with how the show deploys the huge supporting cast in later episodes, this one makes good use of nearly the whole ensemble (other than the absent Eli and Chalky, who get their turn next week), establishes what the conflicts are, etc." Seth Colter Walls of Vulture gave the episode a 3 star rating out of 5 and wrote, "The promise of stronger conflict between Nucky and Rosetti even made me patient for the less-awkward-than-usual detours, in this episode, toward Chicago and Capone-world."

Edward Davis of IndieWire gave the episode a "B" grade and wrote, "The show could pick up its pace and become more gripping in Season 3, but that might be antithetical to the Boardwalk Empire approach where characters slowly walk up to their adversaries with a handshake and grin and then bury daggers into their backs episodes later. More likely, Boardwalk Empire will take the slow and steady approach and while ratings have dipped from Season 1, this is still an absorbing show worth watching. Even if 'Resolution' was more of a reorienting calibration that got the characters and audiences back on its feet from the last season." Teresa Lopez of TV Fanatic gave the episode a 4 star rating out of 5 and wrote, "The premiere did well to remind us of most of the story lines from last season, be it the political aspect with Shooter McGavin or Margaret's infidelity with Owen Sleater. Throw on top of all that, this new storyline of Margaret's involvement in the hospital - along with Chalky White - and we have a recipe for amazing. I loved how Margaret didn't throw that young doctor under the bus for telling her about the lack of prenatal care at the hospital."

Michael Noble of Den of Geek wrote, "Overall, a steady if slightly unimpressive start to the season. When Boardwalk Empire has confidence in itself it is superb, but all too often it falls back on tired tropes and obvious didactic storytelling. The production design and performances remain excellent – so much of the narrative can be told without forcing it on the viewer. Half of this episode did this, half did not. We're in the third season now; the show should be hitting its stride. After all, you can't be half a gangster." Michelle Rafferty of Paste gave the episode a 9 out of 10 and wrote, "The characters' ongoing struggles with these most innate human desires and questions are what make this show more than just a gorgeous historical set-piece, and from that standpoint, the season is off to a good start as far as I can tell."
