= Shea Whigham =

American actor (born 1969)

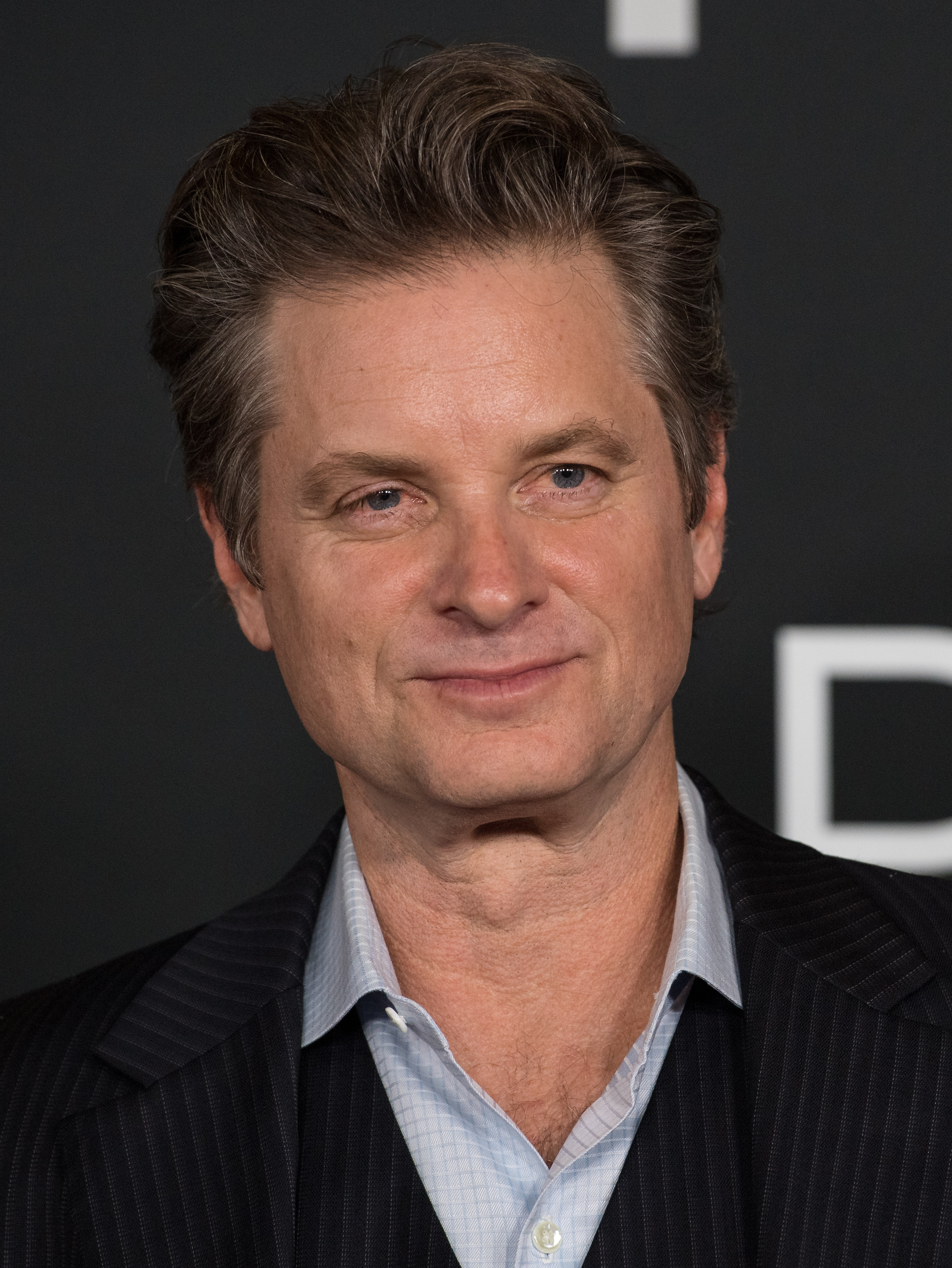
- Whigham in 2018
- Born: January 5, 1969 (age 57); Tallahassee, Florida, U.S.
- Education: Tyler Junior College (attended); State University of New York, Purchase (BFA)
- Occupation: Actor
- Years active: 1997–present
- Spouse: Christine Whigham (m. 1995)
- Children: 4, including Giorgia

Shea Whigham (born January 5, 1969) is an American actor best known for portraying Elias "Eli" Thompson in the drama series Boardwalk Empire. He also appeared in the first season of True Detective and the third season of Fargo and in numerous films, including Silver Linings Playbook, The Wolf of Wall Street, and Joker.

== Early life ==
Whigham was born in Tallahassee, Florida, the son of attorney Frank and school librarian Beth. The family moved to Lake Mary, Florida, when Whigham was five years old. He attended Lake Mary High School.

Whigham attended Tyler Junior College in Tyler, Texas, and then transferred to the acting conservatory at State University of New York, Purchase, where only eight out of his 31 classmates graduated.

== Career ==
After graduating, Whigham co-founded the theatre troupe the Rorschach Group with his college roommate Kirk Acevedo in New York City and served as an actor and artistic director with the troupe for three years.

Whigham appeared in one 1997 episode of the television series Ghost Stories before he received a starring role in the 2000 film Tigerland. He went on to appear in the television films Submerged, R.U.S./H., and Paradise before acting in the 2003 film All the Real Girls. Between 2004 and 2006, he appeared in the Japanese film Out of This World, the drama television series Medical Investigation, and the films Water, Man of the House, Faith of My Fathers, Lords of Dogtown, Psychic Driving, and South of Heaven.

Whigham appeared in Pride and Glory and co-starred in the horror film Splinter, the thriller Blood Creek, and the science fiction film Radio Free Albemuth.

He had a regular leading role on the HBO series Boardwalk Empire as Elias "Eli" Thompson, sheriff of Atlantic County, New Jersey, for the show's entire run. In 2014, he appeared in the HBO series True Detective as the disillusioned former minister Joel Theriot. He appeared in two (Note: He was uncredited for his appearance in the episode "Fugitive Number One".) episodes of FX's Justified in 2015.

Between 2012 and 2017, he had several movie roles, such as The Wolf of Wall Street, American Hustle, Silver Linings Playbook, Term Life, and Kong: Skull Island. In 2018, he appeared in the films Sicario: Day of the Soldado, First Man, and Bad Times at the El Royale. In 2019, he appeared in the Warner Bros./DC Comics psychological thriller Joker as GCPD Detective Burke. He also appeared in both seasons of HBO's Vice Principals as Ray Liptrapp; appeared in Fargo and the miniseries Waco; and he starred in the television series Homecoming alongside Julia Roberts for which he was nominated for a Critics' Choice Television Award for Best Supporting Actor in a Drama Series. In 2020, he was cast as Pete Strickland on HBO's reimagining of Perry Mason, a role for which he received attention for his moustache.

He has appeared in several projects alongside actors Michael Shannon and Paul Sparks, both of whom starred on Boardwalk Empire and Waco. Shannon and Whigham also appeared together in The Quarry, Take Shelter, Tigerland, and Bad Lieutenant: Port of Call New Orleans. In October 2025, it was announced that Whigham would be joining Jamie Foxx and Andrés Baiz in the Netflix feature film Fight for '84.

== Personal life ==
Whigham has four children, including actress Giorgia Whigham, with his wife Christine Whigham.

== Filmography ==
Key
| † | Denotes films that have not yet been released |

=== Film ===
| Year | Title | Role | Notes |
|---|---|---|---|
| 1998 | Of Love & Fantasy | Craig | |
| 2000 | Tigerland | Private Wilson | |
| 2002 | Bad Company | CIA Agent Wells | Uncredited |
| 2003 | All the Real Girls | 'Tip' | |
| 2004 | Out of This World | Russell Reade | |
| 2004 | Water | Daniel West | |
| 2005 | Man of the House | Texas Ranger Holt | |
| 2005 | Lords of Dogtown | Drake Landon | |
| 2005 | Psychic Driving | Ryan Barrett | Short film |
| 2006 | Wristcutters: A Love Story | Eugene | |
| 2006 | First Snow | Vincent McClure | |
| 2008 | South of Heaven | 'Mad Dog' Mantee | |
| 2008 | Pride and Glory | Officer Kenny Dugan | |
| 2008 | Splinter | Dennis Farell | |
| 2009 | Blood Creek | Luke Benny | |
| 2009 | The Killing Room | Tony Mazzolla | |
| 2009 | Spooner | Stan Manfretti | |
| 2009 | Fast & Furious | FBI Agent Michael Stasiak | |
| 2009 | Bad Lieutenant: Port of Call New Orleans | Justin | |
| 2010 | Radio Free Albemuth | Phil | |
| 2010 | Barry Munday | Donald | |
| 2010 | Machete | Sniper | |
| 2010 | The Conspirator | Captain Cottingham | |
| 2011 | Take Shelter | Dewart | Nominated—Gotham Independent Film Award for Best Ensemble Cast |
| 2011 | The Lincoln Lawyer | Dwayne Jeffrey 'D.J.' Corliss | |
| 2011 | This Must Be the Place | Ernie Ray | |
| 2011 | Catch .44 | Billy | |
| 2012 | Big Miracle | SAR Pilot Conrad | |
| 2012 | Savages | Chad, Cartel Lawyer | |
| 2012 | Silver Linings Playbook | Jake Solitano | Nominated—Gotham Independent Film Award for Best Ensemble Cast |
| 2013 | Fast & Furious 6 | FBI Agent Michael Stasiak | |
| 2013 | American Hustle | Carl Elway | Screen Actors Guild Award for Outstanding Performance by a Cast in a Motion Picture |
| 2013 | The Wolf of Wall Street | Captain Ted Beecham | |
| 2014 | Non-Stop | Agent Marenick | |
| 2015 | Lila & Eve | Detective Holliston | |
| 2015 | Cop Car | Man | |
| 2015 | Knight of Cups | Jim | |
| 2016 | Star Trek Beyond | Teenaxi Leader | Voice |
| 2016 | Term Life | Detective Matty Miller | |
| 2017 | Kong: Skull Island | Captain Earl Cole | |
| 2017 | Death Note | Detective James Turner | |
| 2017 | Wheelman | Mohawk Man | |
| 2018 | The Catcher Was a Spy | Joe Cronin | |
| 2018 | Beirut | Gary Ruzak | |
| 2018 | Sicario: Day of the Soldado | Andy Wheeldon | |
| 2018 | First Man | Gus Grissom | |
| 2018 | Bad Times at the El Royale | Dr. Woodbury Laurence | |
| 2018 | City of Lies | Frank Lyga | |
| 2018 | Vice | Wayne Vincent | |
| 2019 | To the Stars | Hank Deerborne | |
| 2019 | Low Tide | Sergeant Kent | |
| 2019 | Joker | Detective Burke | |
| 2020 | The Quarry | The Man | Also executive producer |
| 2020 | Vampires vs. the Bronx | Frank Polidori | |
| 2021 | F9 | FBI Agent Michael Stasiak | |
| 2021 | The Gateway | Parker Jode | |
| 2021 | Small Engine Repair | 'Packie' Hanrahan | |
| 2021 | South of Heaven | Officer Schmidt | |
| 2022 | The Gray Man | Six's Father | |
| 2023 | Fancy Dance | Frank | |
| 2023 | Eileen | Jim Dunlop | |
| 2023 | Spider-Man: Across the Spider-Verse | George Stacy | Voice |
| 2023 | Mission: Impossible – Dead Reckoning | Jasper Briggs | |
| 2024 | Lake George | Don | |
| 2025 | Mission: Impossible – The Final Reckoning | Jasper Briggs | |
| 2025 | F1 | Chip Hart | |
| 2026 | Ghost Soldier | Scott Peary | |
| TBA | The Stalemate † | TBA | Post-production |
| TBA | Fight for '84 † | TBA | Post-production |
| TBA | Copperhead † | TBA | Filming |

=== Television ===
| Year | Title | Role | Notes |
|---|---|---|---|
| 1997 | Ghost Stories | Eric Duke | Episode: "Cold in the Grave" |
| 2001 | Submerged | Captain Oliver Naquin | Television film |
| 2002 | R.U.S./H. | Odell Tippy | Pilot |
| 2004 | Medical Investigation | Barrett Fidler | 2 episodes |
| 2004 | Paradise | Jeremiah Alcott | Television film |
| 2005 | Faith of My Fathers | Norris Overly | Television film |
| 2006 | ER | Bobby Kenyon | 3 episodes |
| 2007 | Standoff | Andre / Jared Kendall | Episode: "Ex-Factor" |
| 2009 | Lie to Me | Jered Blunt | Episode: "Life Is Priceless" |
| 2009 | Numb3rs | Tom Kardum | Episode: "The Fifth Man" |
| 2009 | Medium | Patrick Wilkes | Episode: "New Terrain" |
| 2010–2014 | Boardwalk Empire | Elias 'Eli' Thompson | 49 episodes Screen Actors Guild Award for Outstanding Performance by an Ensemble in a Drama Series (2011–2012); Nominated—Screen Actors Guild Award for Outstanding Performance by an Ensemble in a Drama Series (2013–2015) |
| 2014 | True Detective | Joel Theriot | 2 episodes |
| 2015 | Agent Carter | Roger Dooley | 7 episodes |
| 2015 | Justified | Merrill | Episode: "Collateral" |
| 2016–2017 | Vice Principals | Ray Liptrapp | 15 episodes |
| 2017 | The Legend of Master Legend | Peanut-Head | Pilot |
| 2017 | Fargo | 'Moe' Dammick | 5 episodes |
| 2017 | Narcos | Agent Duffy | 2 episodes |
| 2018 | Waco | Mitch Decker | 6 episodes |
| 2018 | Homecoming | Thomas Carrasco | 8 episodes Nominated—Critics' Choice Television Award for Best Supporting Actor in a Drama Series |
| 2018 | Dirty John | William Meehan | Episode: "Lord High Executioner" |
| 2019 | Modern Love | Peter | 1 episode (Season 1 Episode 6) |
| 2020–2023 | Perry Mason | Pete Strickland | Main role |
| 2022 | Gaslit | G. Gordon Liddy | Limited series Nominated—Critics' Choice Television Award for Best Supporting Actor in a Movie/Miniseries; Nominated—Satellite Award for Best Supporting Actor – Series, Miniseries or Television Film |
| 2023 | Waco: The Aftermath | Mitch Decker | 5 episodes |
| 2023 | The Righteous Gemstones | Dusty Daniels | 2 episodes |
| 2023 | Lawmen: Bass Reeves | Colonel George Reeves | 2 episodes |
| 2025 | American Primeval | Jim Bridger | 6 episodes |
| 2025 | Bad Thoughts | PQ | Episode: "Jobs" |
| 2025 | Death by Lightning | Roscoe Conkling | 4 episodes |
| 2026 | Sugar | Tom Flyberg | 2 episodes |
| TBA | The Murder of JonBenét Ramsey | Alex Hunter | Upcoming miniseries |

=== Video games ===
| Year | Title | Role |
|---|---|---|
| 2000 | Smuggler's Run | Jon |
