= Eli Thompson (Boardwalk Empire) =

Fictional character

- First appearance: Boardwalk Empire
- Last appearance: Eldorado
- Created by: Terence Winter
- Portrayed by: Shea Whigham; Oakes Fegley (1884); Ryan Dinning (1897)

In-universe information
- Full name: Elias Thompson
- Nicknames: Eli; Sheriff Thompson
- Gender: male
- Occupation: Sheriff of Atlantic City (seasons 1–2) warehouse worker (season 3) partner in Nucky's organization (season 4) mob enforcer and hitman (season 5)
- Spouse: June Thompson (1898–1931)
- Significant other: Sigrid Mueller (1925–1931)
- Children: William "Willie" Thompson (son); Michael Thompson (son); Dermott Thompson (son); Brian Thompson (son); Patrick Thompson (son); Nora Thompson (daughter); Edith Thompson (daughter); Ann Thompson (daughter); Kathleen Thompson (daughter) unnamed baby Thompson (born child)
- Relatives: Ethan Thompson (father); Susan Thompson (sister); Elenore Thompson (mother); Enoch "Nucky" Thompson (brother)
- Nationality: Irish American
- Status: Deceased due to virtue of time era

Elias "Eli" Thompson is a fictional character in the HBO TV show Boardwalk Empire where he was portrayed by Shea Whigham and, in flashbacks in season 5, Ryan Dinning and Oakes Fegley.

He is the younger brother of the protagonist of the series, Nucky Thompson (portrayed by Steve Buscemi). Nucky is based on real-life Atlantic City politician Enoch L. Johnson, while Eli is based on his brother and real-life Sheriff of Atlantic City Alfred "Alf" Johnson.

== Fictional biography ==
=== Early life ===
Elias "Eli" Thompson was born in Atlantic City, New Jersey in 1877 to Ethan and Elenore Thompson. He grew up alongside his older brother Enoch (Nucky) and his younger sister Susan in a poor home. Eli had a great relationship with both of his parents and his two siblings, unaware that Ethan was an abusive alcoholic who used to beat Elenore and Nucky whenever he was drunk.

=== Susan's death ===
In 1884, young Eli first asks Nucky (Nolan Lyons) to help fix his slingshot and then asks what Ethan (Ian Hart) and Elenore (Erin Dilly) are doing and what is happening to Susan. Ethan later comes home while Eli and Nucky are eating dinner, and asks them how Nucky's day swimming and catching coins went. After Nucky replies he didn't catch any, Ethan tells Eli to go outside. After Eli leaves the house, Ethan beats Nucky and warns him to be better next time.

Later that night, Susan dies of her ongoing tuberculosis. The next day, Nucky, Eli, Ethan and Elenore bury her. Eli weeps at his sister's death, and tries to comfort his mother and Nucky. Eli overhears Ethan talking to Nucky about the Commodore (John Ellison Conlee) visiting the house earlier that day and the idea of giving Susan a proper burial, which he scoffed at.

After the summer in Atlantic City is over, Eli begins second grade. One day, Nucky arrives home to find out that Ethan and Elenore locked the kids out of the house. Eli tries to peek in to see what they are doing, but decides to playfight with Nucky instead. The two boys then go to the beach and watch seagulls on the waves. Nucky tells Eli that he has to be independent now. Eli asks why, and Nucky says he has had enough of the rich tourists coming to Atlantic City every summer and making them look poor in comparison. Later, the boys go to the Corner Hotel and stay in one of the hotel rooms, which Eli likes. The two are later caught by Sheriff Peter Lindsay (Boris McGiver), who feels sorry for them and takes them to his home, where they have a fun and light dinner with him, his wife and their son and daughter. After dinner, Sheriff Lindsay takes Nucky and Eli home and tells them to not pull off this stunt again.

=== Running for Deputy ===
Several years later, a grown up Eli meets a woman named June and the two begin dating. In 1897, Eli mentions to Nucky (now a Sheriff's Deputy of Atlantic City) that he and June had sex at a garden holiday place. He also talks to Nucky about finding a job as a deputy. Nucky informs him that Eli just has to wait and that he will be on the police force one day as well. Nucky then sees a thief that has been running around Atlantic City for the past few days and chases her, as Eli shouts at the thief, thinking it is a boy. Later that night, Nucky and Eli stake out at the hideout of the thief. Eli tells Nucky how Ethan misses him, but Nucky just insults Ethan. Eli does not understand the feud between Nucky and their father. The thief then returns to the hiding spot, and Eli and Nucky catch the thief, who is revealed to be a girl named Gillian Darmody (Madeleine Rose Yen). Nucky takes her to the police station under arrest.

A few days later, Nucky gets a call from Eli that Ethan has beat Elenore again. Furious, Nucky runs to his parents' house to find Elenore. Ethan gets up and points a gun at Nucky. Elenore tells them to stop, but Nucky tells him to pull the trigger. Ethan gives the shotgun to Nucky and then fights him. Elenore and Eli leave the house, and Nucky joins them. Eli and Elenore watch as Ethan yells that Nucky will never forget where he really came from and where he was raised.

In 1903, Elenore Thompson passes away. Eli, Nucky and Ethan mourn her death. Eli later becomes a police officer and then deputy sheriff to Sheriff Victor Sickles in Tabor Heights. He is then promoted to being a full-time sheriff of Tabor Heights while Nucky is the sheriff of Atlantic City. After Nucky takes over the Commodore's operations, Eli becomes the sheriff of Atlantic City, with Sickles reinstated as sheriff of Tabor Heights and Eli naming Raymond Halloran (Adam Mucci) as his deputy. Eli has married June (Nisi Sturgis) and they have nine children: William, Michael, Patrick, Brian, Dermott, Nora, Kathleen, Ann and Edith. Eli becomes a member of Nucky's political machine, which includes Chief Clerk of the Fourth Ward Paddy Ryan (Samuel Taylor), Alderman George O'Neill (William Hill), Alderman and Ward Boss Al Boyd (Edward McGinty), Ward Boss Damien Fleming (Victor Verheaghe), Ernie Moran (John Keating), Duncan O'Connor (John Treacy Egan), Mayor Harry Bacharach (John Rue) and his and Nucky's childhood friend Alderman Jim Neary (Robert Clohessy). Eli congratulates Nucky's protege and WW1 veteran James "Jimmy" Darmody (Michael Pitt) when he returns home to Atlantic City in December 1919 after the war is over. They also Jimmy's wife Angela (Aleksa Palladino) and reunite with his mother Gillian Darmody (Gretchen Mol). Eli also meets Nucky's mistress Lucy Danziger (Paz de la Huerta), clothes shop owner Madame Isabelle Jeunet (Anna Katarina), Polish bootlegger and Nucky's business partner Mickey Doyle (Paul Sparks) and Nucky's butler and servant Edward Anselm "Eddie" Kessler (Anthony Laciura).

=== Season One ===
In his first appearance in the series, Eli celebrates the beginning of prohibition and bootlegging at Babette's Supper Club along with Nucky, Lucy, Jimmy, Paddy and all the other ward bosses. Later, he investigates the Hammonton hijacking and finds out it was perpetrated by Jimmy, Billy Winslow (Chase Coleman) and Al Capone (Stephen Graham). After Eli shared the hijacking details to Nucky, Nucky tells him to assassinate local drunk and abusive husband Hans Schroeder (Joseph Sikora) for killing his unborn baby and hospitalizing his wife Margaret (Kelly Macdonald). Eli and Deputy Halloran kidnap and beat Hans to death before dumping his body into the river, where it is later labelled as the "catch of the day" and seen by Nucky and Bill McCoy (Pearce Bunting).

After being admonished by Nucky for doing the murder in public, Eli finds out that a victim of the Hammonton hijacking is still alive. Eli goes to the hospital to save Jimmy from being caught by the authorities. Before Eli could smother him to death, the victim is wheeled to New York City by FBI Agent Nelson Van Alden (Michael Shannon) and his partner Eric Sebso (Erik Weiner). Eli tells the FBI agents about Jimmy, forcing Nucky to exile Jimmy from Atlantic City. Later, Eli and Nucky find the driver of Chalky White (Michael Kenneth Williams), leader of the Black community in Atlantic City and one of Nucky's business partners, hanged to death.

A few months later, Nucky suspects the KKK of murdering Chalky's driver. Eli and Halloran kidnap the KKK leader (Scott Sowers) and bring him to Chalky's place, where Chalky tortures him to death with his tools while telling him his life story.

The local Celtic dinner is hosted in Atlantic City on Saint Patrick's Day. Eli reads about how to give a speech from a book by Dale Carnegie and Daniel Webster. Nucky criticizes him for giving a speech. At the dinner, Eli gives his speech in front of the aldermen, ward bosses, Mayor Bacharach, the Commodore (Dabney Coleman) and Ethan Thompson (Tom Aldredge). It goes well until the Irish start fighting when they hear talk of the British. Nucky begins berates Eli for his speech, when the dinner is raided by Van Alden. The FBI arrest Jim Neary while outside as everyone is going home. A drunk and saddened Eli tries to punch Nucky, but he is taken home, where he vomits in the toilet as June helps him. Eli is later shown bringing New York City gangster and accomplice of gangster and gambler Arnold Rothstein (Michael Stuhlbarg), Charles "Lucky" Luciano (Vincent Piazza) into Nucky's office at the Ritz-Carlton Hotel. Nucky and Eli interrogate Luciano and beat him up for going against Nucky and starting a relationship with Gillian Darmody.

After Ethan Thompson falls down and suffers a stroke, Eli brings him to live at his house. Nucky has their childhood home burned down. While Nucky is in Washington D.C. for a convention of the 1920 United States Presidential Election, Eli hears about the D'Alessio Brothers, who are going against him and Nucky. One night after Eli and June return home following a relative's wedding, Eli stops at Nucky's business partner Lolly Steinmann (Danny Burstein)'s casino while June is asleep in the car. Eli finds Lolly and a few others are being held hostage. Before Eli can do anything, he is shot and injured by the D'Alessios, who rob the rest of the casino and make their escape.

After being released from the hospital, Eli realizes that Nucky made Halloran the Sheriff of Atlantic City. Eli argues with Nucky about it, saying he is Hardeen to Nucky's Harry Houdini. Nucky insults Eli by saying that he is only Sheriff of Atlantic City because of him, and that Eli will never be remembered as much as him. After Warren G. Harding has been elected President of the United States and Edward L. Bader (Kevin O'Rourke) has been elected as Mayor of Atlantic City, Nucky re-elects Eli as Sheriff of Atlantic City and has Halloran become his deputy again. Eli, still angry at being in Nucky's shadow, secretly starts an insurrection conspiracy to bring Nucky down as the "King of Atlantic City" and treasurer. Joining Eli in this conspiracy is Jimmy Darmody (now back from Chicago), Gillian, Mickey Doyle and the Commodore, who wants to take over Atlantic City once again.

=== Season Two ===
In February 1921, Eli continues his job as Sheriff of Atlantic City and working alongside Nucky while also planning with Jimmy, the Commodore and Gillian to overthrow Nucky from power as treasurer of Atlantic City. To start, Jimmy, Eli and the Commodore send the KKK to attack Nucky's warehouse, owned by Chalky White, with the hopes of assassinating Chalky. When that fails and Chalky kills one of the KKK members, Eli and Nucky go to his house and tell Chalky to willingly go to jail for his and their own safety. Eli, Jimmy and the Commodore then send Deputy US Attorney George "Solomon" Bishop (Bill Sage), who arrests Nucky at the Ritz-Carlton for election fraud and takes over his office and operations.

After Nucky's arrest, Eli and the Commodore recruit Jim Neary, Paddy Ryan, Damien Fleming, George O'Neill and Al Boyd to help them to get rid of Nucky and take over Atlantic City. Fleming drops out and remains secretly loyal to Nucky alongside Mayor Edward Bader. After being released from prison, Nucky realizes that Eli, the Commodore, Gillian, Jimmy, Neary, O'Neill, Boyd and Paddy Ryan all betrayed him to take him down. Nucky calls Eli, and Eli tells him that he is going to be defeated by him now finally.

Eli continues his plan, but the Commodore suffers a stroke. Noticing how Jimmy and Gillian are with him, Eli secretly decides to run back to Nucky. After one of Jimmy's warehouses explode, the Commodore's financial backers confront Eli and Jimmy over it. The meeting ends with one of the backers physically striking Jimmy with his cane and humiliating him in front of the rest of the crowd. Eli goes to Nucky's mansion and apologizes for all the things he has done to him and asks to be accepted back. Nucky initially says yes, but demands Eli get on his knees and beg. The brothers fight, but Margaret ends it when she points a gun at Eli and kicks him out of the house. Eli is later confronted by George O'Neill, who knows Eli went to see Nucky. Eli beats George to death with a pipe wrench and burys his body near his house.

After realizing that Nucky will never accept him back, Eli goes back to Jimmy's side. One day, Eli has a meeting at the Commodore's mansion with Jimmy, Lucky Luciano, Meyer Lansky (Anatol Yusef), Al Capone and Richard Harrow (Jack Huston), where they discuss ideas on how to expand their criminal empire. Eli tells Jimmy to just kill Nucky to get rid of him once and for all, and the others agree with it. Jimmy does carry out the assassination attempt at Babette's, but Nucky survives. Meanwhile, Ethan Thompson dies of a stroke. Nucky, Eli and the rest of his family and relatives attend Ethan's funeral. Nucky confronts Eli by asking him if he wanted Nucky in that coffin and then says it is a good thing that their dad died. Eli asks why Nucky hated Ethan so much.

After attending Ethan's funeral, Eli has another meeting in the Commodore's mansion where he talks with a bunch of hotel owners, Jimmy and the Commodore about the recent black riots in the boardwalk (caused by Chalky White and Dunn Purnsley (Erik LaRay Harvey) ). Eli then confronts an injured Deputy Halloran about reporting the murder of Hans Schroeder to the U.S. Attorney. Before he could continue his conversation, Eli is arrested by Deputy U.S. Attorney Esther Randolph (Julianne Nicholson) and put in a holding cell until his and Nucky's trials.

At his court case, Eli sits with his lawyer Douglas Wallbridge alongside Deputy Halloran, Halloran's lawyer, Nucky, Margaret, Nucky's part-time lawyer Bill Fallon (David Aaron Baker). Esther Randolph tells the judge what crimes Eli, Halloran and Nucky are charged with, including Hans Schroeder's death. Fallon objects, saying that her evidence is not clear on the murders. Nucky is acquitted, but Eli and Deputy Halloran are found guilty. Eli received a one-year sentence to prison and Halloran is sentenced to life in prison. Eli also loses his sheriff title, relegated to being a citizen of Atlantic City. Nucky visits Eli at his home following the court cases and ends the discussion with the quote, "Et Tu, Eli" (meaning "You Too, Eli"), referencing William Shakespeare's play and biography of Julius Caesar. The night before he goes to jail, Eli joins Nucky, Nucky's right-hand man Owen Sleater (Charlie Cox) and Philadelphia gangster Manny "Munya" Horvitz (William Forsythe) at the Atlantic City War Memorial to meet Jimmy Darmody. Nucky has Owen release fake handcuffs on Manny before he points a gun at Jimmy. Jimmy talks about his war experiences and former company before he is finally shot to death by Nucky. The next day, Eli goes to jail to begin his sentence, leaving his family alone to take care of the house. During his sentence, his oldest son William "Willie" Thompson (Kevin Csolak) drops out of school to provide for the family by working at the local lumber yard.

=== Season Three ===
In January 1923, Eli is released from prison. He is picked up by Mickey Doyle, who tells him that Manny is dead. Mickey drives Eli to his home, where he reunites with his family. Eli finds out that Willie dropped out of school and is working at the lumber yard. Eli thanks Willie for caring and providing for his family but says that he will be the breadwinner now. Willie still works at the yard, disappointing Eli, who is also mad about his job as a warehouse worker for Mickey and Owen Sleater. One day during one of their bootlegging journeys, Eli, Mickey, Owen and the other warehouse workers are confronted by gangster Gyp Rosetti, (Bobby Cannavale) who tells them to go back as he is taking control of their route. Owen tries to call Nucky, but Nucky is busy and hangs up. Gyp ultimately take over the route as Eli and Mickey watch.

Eli and the other warehouse workers try to make their rum runs but are blocked again by Gyp and his henchmen, who massacre the workers and take the area as Eli escapes and runs to inform Nucky. After Gyp is kicked out of Tabor Heights, Eli confronts Sheriff Ramsey about the fact that Gyp still stole most of their alcohol from the warehouse and did not arrest Gyp for killing Sheriff Victor Sickles.

On Easter Sunday, Nucky is at Eli's house with Margaret and her kids, Teddy and Emily Schroeder. After the adults entertain the children, Eli and Nucky go down to the basement, where Nucky tells Eli that he is still angry at his betrayal two years ago. Eli tells Nucky to shoot and kill him, even gives him a gun to do so. Nucky just unloads the gun and tells off Eli, noting that everything has to be a melodrama with him. Nucky tells Eli that he is now an equal partner in the warehouse distillery with Mickey Doyle as a thank you for reporting the Tabor Heights massacre to him.

After the boardwalk explodes, Nucky, who is injured and has PTSD from it, is helped by Eli, Chalky, Eddie Kessler, Owen and Margaret. They all celebrate Emily's birthday before preparing for a meeting with Arnold Rothstein, Wild Bill Lovett, Peg Leg Lonergan, Lucky Luciano, Frankie Yale (Joseph Riccobene) and Waxey Gordon (Nick Sandow) on how to take care of Rosetti. After all of the bosses refuse to help Nucky out with hits on Rosetti or his boss and backer Joe Masseria (Ivo Nandi), Eli overhears Nucky saying that he will have Owen and corrupt FBI Agent Stan Sawicki (Joseph Aniska) try to assassinate Masseria at a Turkish bath in New York City. Eli finds out that the assassination attempt failed and that Owen was killed by Masseria. Owen is sent back to Nucky's mansion in a crate.

After Gyp sends assassins to kill Nucky and Eddie at the Ritz-Carlton, Nucky and Eddie kill all of them. They then hide out at Chalky White's house. Eli hears the news and goes to Chalky's place, along with Al Capone and his henchmen, to team up with Nucky to end Rosetti's reign once and for all. Eli also finds Willie working at the lumber yard and tells Nucky and Chalky to send him home. Eli and Nucky go to the Artemis Club (formerly the Commodore's mansion, now a brothel owned by Gillian Darmody) and find several of Rosetti's henchmen dead (all killed by Richard Harrow). A drugged Gillian tells them that Rosetti and two of his henchmen have fled. Nucky and Eli find Gyp's right-hand man Tonino Sandrelli (Chris Caldovino) and force him to assassinate Rosetti for them. Tonino agrees, and Nucky tells him to never show his face to Nucky or Eli ever again. After Gyp has been executed by Tonino, Eli turns into a more important member of Nucky's empire and business and becomes the breadwinner of his family again. Willie (Ben Rosenfield) goes back to school, gets his high school degree and plans on going to college at Temple University.

=== Season Four ===
In 1924, Eli is once again providing for his family. He is unhappy with the constant shenanigans Willie gets into while at Temple. Willie accidentally kills Henry Gaines, a rival student, by adding a dangerous chemical into his drink. Eli finds out, and Nucky manages to get him out of trouble by framing his roommate Clayton for the murder, causing him to go to prison and for Willie to stay at Temple.

Nucky's butler and servant Eddie Kessler commits suicide. Eli and Mickey show all of Eddie's deposits and files to their partner and corrupt IRS Agent Warren Knox (Brian Geraghty), who is really undercover FBI Agent James Tolliver who tried to make Eddie become an informant but he killed himself. Eli discovers Knox's James Tolliver initials and finds out his real name and identity.

Eli finds out that Willie dropped out of college. Eli kicks him out of the house, causing Willie to run away to Nucky, who is living in the Albatross.

A few days later, Agent Knox/Tolliver, who has now found out about Henry's death and the real cause, confronts Eli and forces him to become an informant for the FBI or he will reveal Willie as a murderer and send him to jail. Eli accepts, knowing the details of the blackmail, and then goes home. He reunites happily with Willie and finds out that he is going back to college again and has found a job. Eli also meets Sally Wheet (Patricia Arquette) during this time.

After becoming an informant, Eli listens to everything Knox/Tolliver says and secretly tells him everything about Nucky's organization, which Tolliver shares with his boss at the FBI, J. Edgar Hoover (Eric Ladin). One day, Tolliver visits Eli at his home and the two privately talk about the organization. Knox threatens Eli that he will reveal his job as an informant if he does not comply to his rules before leaving. Eli is angry at the fact that Knox has come into his home life now.

Knox then tells Eli he has to get Vincenzo Petrucelli (Vincenzo Amato), Joe Masseria, Lucky Luciano, Meyer Lansky, Nucky and Harlem doctor and bootlegger Dr. Valentin Narcisse (Jeffrey Wright) all into one room for a meeting so he can bust them all for their heroin operations. If he does not, he will send Willie to jail. Eli reluctantly agrees. Eli later has dinner with his family and Nucky, when after June describes Knox as a salesman. Eli yells at her and has a mental breakdown in front of everyone. Nucky and Willie look suspiciously at him.

Nucky soon finds out that Eli is an informant for Tolliver/Knox. Nucky points a gun at Eli and makes him explain his betrayal. The two are about to go further until Willie comes into the room. Nucky explains to him what Eli has done before leaving. Willie then yells at Eli and runs away. Eli goes after him back to his house, where he is confronted by Knox/Tolliver in his room on the top floor. Knox threatens Eli by pointing a gun at him, saying Willie is going to be raped by the prisoners. Furious, Eli fights with Knox, which ends with the FBI Agent strangled and beaten to death by Eli. After killing Knox, Eli runs away from Atlantic City to avoid arrest. Nucky send Eli to Chicago and gives him a job with Al Capone. In Chicago, Eli meets with his mob partner and Capone's enforcer George Mueller, who is really former FBI agent Nelson Van Alden, who was found guilty for the murder of Agent Sebso in Season 2 and ran away, becoming a fugitive of the FBI. George/Nelson tells Eli to come with him. Eli goes into the car and the two drive off to Eli's new home in Chicago.

=== Season Five ===
During his time in Chicago, Eli works for Al Capone as a debt collector alongside Van Alden/Mueller. Eli lives in an apartment near Van Alden/Mueller's house and becomes a deadbeat drunk. He misses his family, but does see his wife June every few months when she visits Chicago. Eli also has a brief affair with Van Alden/Mueller's wife Sigrid (Christiane Seidel).

In 1931, Eli and Van Alden/Mueller hijack some crates and kill two henchmen in the process. They give the two crates to Capone the next morning. A few days later, Eli and Van Alden/Mueller are at Capone's office, where Lucky Luciano has a meeting about The Commission and asks Capone if he will join. Capone says he will think about it before Luciano responds by saying that he has seen Van Alden/Mueller somewhere before when he was a Fed. Surprised at this, Al points a gun at Nelson/George's mouth as Eli watches. Van Alden/Mueller manages to talk Capone out of killing him. Eli later meets Capone henchman Mike D'Angelo (Louis Cancelmi).

June visits Eli at his apartment for her usual visit. They have lunch with Van Alden/Mueller, Sigrid and their children. The lunch turns sour when Sigrid reveals her brief affair with Eli when he was drunk. Before an argument could begin, there is a knock at the door and both Van Alden/Mueller and Eli are taken away by D'Angelo (who is revealed to be Special Agent Michael Malone). At FBI headquarters, Van Alden/Mueller and Eli are interrogated by Malone before they are introduced to Agent Eliot Ness (Jim True-Frost). Ness who tells Eli and Van Alden/Mueller to get him some ledgers from Capone's office, which is needed evidence to send Capone to jail for tax evasion. Eli and Van Alden/Mueller reluctantly agree.

At the office, Eli, Van Alden/Mueller and D'Angelo/Malone find the ledgers but are caught by Al's brother Ralph Capone (Domenick Lombardozzi). Ralph confronts Eli and Van Alden/Mueller as D'Angelo/Malone helping him. Al comes back to the office and finds out what is happening. Al yells at the captured Van Alden/Mueller and Eli before once again pointing a gun at Van Alden/Mueller, causing him to attack Capone. He reveals his real name as Nelson Van Alden before he is shot to death from behind by D'Angelo/Malone. Al then tells D'Angelo/Malone to execute Eli outside for him. Once outside, D'Angelo/Malone tells Eli that his job has been done and gives him one dollar to go home. Eli finally returns to Atlantic City.

Back in Atlantic City, Eli reunites with his son Willie, who is now an attorney with the United States Department of Justice. Willlie tells Eli how angry June is with him before telling him to get out of his life. As Eli watches, Willie is kidnapped by Lucky Luciano and Meyer Lansky's henchmen. Eli goes to the club Old Rumpus, owned by Mickey Doyle, where he reunites with Nucky and Mickey. He also meets New York mobster Salvatore Maranzano (Giampero Judica) and Old Rumpus Bell boy Joe Harper (Travis Tope). The gang, along with Nucky's Cuban bodyguard Arquimedes (Paul Calderon), go and confront Lansky, Luciano and their henchmen. They offer a trade deal: Willie is to be given back to them for Luciano and Lansky's friend and associate Bugsy Siegel (Michael Zegen). The deal goes awry, however, when after Bugsy is given back, but Luciano and Lansky still hold Willie captive. A shootout occurs between the two groups, with Arquimedes, Mickey and a few others are killed. Nucky gets down on his knees and begs for Willie. He gives Luciano, Lansky, Siegel and their partner Pinky Rabonowitz (Ethan Herschenfeld) control of Atlantic City in exchange for Willie. Willie returns to his job as an attorney, while Eli leaves the business altogether after helping Luciano assassinate Maranzano. Luciano and Lansky take control of Atlantic City.

Eli moves into an apartment in a run-down building near the Jersey Shore, becoming a drunk. Nucky visits him one day, where he tells Eli to forget all the previous events that have happened, clean himself up and go back to his family. Eli tells him that June hates him now. Nucky responds by saying that he has not seen her since Chicago before he leaves the apartment. Eli opens the package Nucky gave him, which includes thousands of dollars and a razor to shave himself with along with a note telling him to go back to his family. It is unknown what Eli does next or if he even heard of Nucky's death that happened that night in Atlantic City.

== Reception ==
In a 2012 interview for the show preceding Season 3, Whigham explained how he became slimmer for the character when he got out of prison.

In a 2014 interview preceding Season 5 for the Los Angeles Times, Whigham talked about the fact that Eli is the "Everest" of his career.

In an early interview for the show, Whigham talked about how he got prepared for the character, his real-life counterpart and if he would ever like to return to it.

Whigham has won two awards for seasons 1–2 and nominated for three for seasons 3–5 for his role as Eli in the show alongside the rest of the cast. They all won the 17th (2011) and 18th (2012) Screen Actors Guild for an Outstanding Performance by an Ensemble in a Drama Series awards while being nominated for the 19th (2013), 20th (2014) and 21st (2015) Screen Actors Guild awards.

== See also ==
- Enoch L. Johnson
- Nucky Thompson
