= Mickey Doyle =

- Boardwalk Empire character
- First appearance: "Boardwalk Empire"
- Last appearance: "Friendless Child"
- Created by: Terence Winter
- Portrayed by: Paul Sparks

In-universe information
- Full name: Mieczyslaw "Mickey Doyle" Kuzik
- Nickname: Pollack; Bohunk
- Gender: Male
- Occupation: Gangster bootlegger racketeer
- Nationality: Polish American

Mieczyslaw "Mickey Doyle" Kuzik is a fictional character in the HBO TV series Boardwalk Empire. He is played by Paul Sparks. Mickey Doyle is loosely based on Polish American mobster Mickey Duffy.

Mickey is a gangster in Prohibition-era Atlantic City. For the first two seasons, he is the main rival of liquor kingpin Chalky White from Atlantic City’s North Side. He is known for his distinctive, nasal laugh, and serves as the series' comic relief.

== Appearances ==
=== Season one ===
In the first episode of season one, Mickey is introduced as a Polish-American gangster trying to establish himself as a power in the illegal alcohol trade following the passage of the Volstead Act, which outlaws the sale of alcohol. It is revealed that his real name is Mieczyslaw Kusik, and he changed it to "Mickey Doyle" to pass himself off as Irish-American. He meets with Atlantic County Treasurer and political boss Nucky Thompson (Steve Buscemi) to show him his bootlegging operation. Mickey tells Nucky that he expects to produce 2000 crates a week. He gets into a scuffle with Nucky's driver, Jimmy Darmody (Michael Pitt), until Nucky breaks it up. Jimmy later gets revenge on Mickey by informing Prohibition Agent Nelson Van Alden (Michael Shannon) about Mickey's operation. Van Alden raids Mickey's operation and arrests him. Nucky gives Mickey's operations to Chalky White (Michael K. Williams), an African-American gangster.

Mickey convinces Chalky's rivals, the D'Alessio brothers, to murder Chalky and gives them a description of his car, a Packard. They track the car but mistakenly kill Chalky's driver instead of Chalky himself. Mickey persuades the D'Alessio brothers to rob the ward boss in broad daylight on the boardwalk. He then joins them in going into business with Arnold Rothstein (Michael Stuhlbarg). Soon after, the D'Alessios unilaterally decide to assassinate Nucky without consulting Doyle, but they botch the hit and Nucky escapes unharmed. Startled by this escalation of violence, Mickey returns to Nucky's side and provides information on the D'Alessios' operations in exchange for his life being spared.

=== Season two ===
In Season 2, Mickey joins Jimmy Darmody's crew, along with Al Capone (Stephen Graham), Charlie Luciano (Vincent Piazza) and Meyer Lansky (Anatol Yusef), and with them conspires to overthrow Nucky. Mickey brings Philadelphia gangster Manny Horvitz (William Forsythe) to a meeting with Jimmy, and helps to convince Horvitz to lend them money. Mickey promises that he can be operational within a week or two provided he gets alcohol to reconstitute. Unfortunately for Mickey and Jimmy, Mickey's distillery is bombed by Owen Sleater (Charlie Cox), Nucky's new enforcer. The distillery's destruction prevents Jimmy from being able to payback his debt to Horvitz.

After Jimmy has successfully brokered a peace deal with Nucky while left him in charge of Atlantic City, he throws a party to celebrate. When Jimmy notices that Mickey has brought Horvitz along, he angrily throws Mickey off a second floor landing, sending him crashing into a table.

Mickey meets with the rest of Jimmy's crew at their new warehouse in Atlantic City to view the medicinal alcohol they have bought from George Remus (Glenn Fleshler). Doyle oversees his men diluting the alcohol in a vat as the others arrive. Doyle adds that Horvitz, whom Jimmy had tried to have killed, is still a problem and Jimmy instructs Doyle to pay him off with liquor. Later that day, Mickey has a tense meeting with Horvitz in which he blames the assassination attempt on Waxey Gordon (Nick Sandow); Horvitz doesn't believe him, however, and tortures him into giving up the location of Jimmy's residence.

When Jimmy suddenly disappears following the murder of his wife Angela (Aleksa Palladino) by Horvitz, Mickey sells his entire share of the liquor in Philadelphia. Lansky keeps track of figures in his notebook. Capone instructs Mickey to sell Jimmy's portion of the stock, and pay Jimmy out of his own share. When Mickey protests, Luciano reminds him that Rothstein holds a life insurance policy on him; if Mickey does not do as instructed, Luciano will kill him and split the insurance money with Capone. Cowed, Mickey accepts the deal. However, he then goes to Van Alden and sells out his partners, giving him the location of their next meeting. In return for that information, Mickey demands half of the money the police would seize. Mickey's hopes for a huge profit fall through, however, when Van Alden is forced to flee the state to escape a murder charge. Desperate for work and protection against his former partners, Mickey betrays Jimmy and returns to Nucky's side.

=== Season three ===
By season 3, Mickey is working for Nucky as the crew boss in one of Nucky's liquor warehouses. He is first seen with Nucky as he interrogates a thief who had stolen some of his liquor; Nucky explains to the thief that Mickey is truly at fault for the theft, as he had left the liquor unattended while he went to an outhouse. Nucky's brother, Eli (Shea Whigham), who's been recently released from prison, is put to work directly under Mickey, much to Eli's annoyance. Mickey throws his weight around the warehouse, at one point intimidating one of his movers by claiming to have killed Horvitz. The word spreads that Mickey killed Horvitz, angering Richard Harrow (Jack Huston), the man who actually committed the assassination as revenge for Angela's death. Harrow kidnaps Mickey and brings him before Nucky, and forces him at gunpoint to admit that he lied.

Facing a blockade from Nucky's rival Gyp Rosetti (Bobby Cannavale), Mickey decides to route a convoy of trucks carrying Nucky's liquor through the small town of Tabor Heights. He dismisses Eli's warnings that it is a trap. Sure enough, Rosetti's gang ambushes the convoy, killing several of Nucky's men; though Mickey and Eli are able to escape, however.

When Rosetti's men invade Atlantic City with backing from Joe Masseria (Ivo Nandi), Mickey manages to avoid assassination by Rosetti's men and joins in on Nucky's war party to fight off Rosetti's forces, along with Eli, Chalky and Capone. Eventually, they are successful in reclaiming control over Atlantic City.

=== Season four ===
In season 4, Mickey runs Nucky's main warehouse. When Nucky's nephew, Willie (Ben Rosenfield), tries to charm his way into getting a crate of whiskey for a party, Mickey chastises him and throws him out. Moments later, however, he takes pity on the boy and gives him a crate. In so doing, he unwittingly sets a chain of events in motion that end with Willie facing murder charges.

Mickey accompanies Nucky to Tampa, Florida, where Nucky intends to invest in land. There, they both meet speakeasy owner Sally Wheet (Patricia Arquette), and Mickey immediately has designs on her. Sally prefers Nucky, but flirts openly with Mickey in order to make Nucky jealous. When it appears that she is about to sleep with Mickey, however, Nucky hits him in the forehead with his former valet Eddie Kessler's (Anthony Laciura) cane that Mickey took, impressing Sally and scaring Mickey into backing down.

=== Season five ===
While Nucky is in Havana, Cuba trying to procure an exclusive distribution contract with Bacardi, Meyer Lansky unsuccessfully makes an attempt on his life. When Nucky returns to Atlantic City, Mickey is running his bootlegging operations and Chalky White's former restaurant, now a burlesque club.

Nucky, and by extension Mickey, end up fighting with Lansky and Luciano in a bloody gang war with the aid of New York Mafia "Boss of all bosses" Salvatore Maranzano (Giampiero Judica). Mickey informs Nucky and Maranzano that Luciano has fire bombed four of their trucks, costing them over $100,000. Nucky has Mickey go to New York to kidnap Luciano's associate Benjamin Siegel (Michael Zegen) in order to force a meeting and end the feud. Before the meeting starts, Nucky gives Mickey the title and full ownership of his burlesque club, as well as five percent of every profit made there. When Luciano says that he wants everything Nucky has, including the club, Mickey tries to reason with Luciano, but to no avail - Luciano shoots him in the throat, killing him.

== Origins ==
Mickey Doyle is loosely based on Polish American Philadelphia-based mobster and bootlegger Mickey Duffy, who was also killed in Atlantic City in 1931.

== Reception ==
Paul Sparks was nominated for three "Outstanding Performance by an Ensemble in a Drama Series" Screen Actors Guild Awards in 2014, 2015, and 2013, and won the award twice in 2011 and 2012 for his role along with the rest of the cast in the series.
