= Nucky Thompson =

Fictional character in the period crime political drama TV series Boardwalk Empire

- Boardwalk Empire character
- Nucky in the series premiere.
- First appearance: "Boardwalk Empire"
- Last appearance: "Eldorado"
- Created by: Terence Winter
- Portrayed by: Steve Buscemi; Marc Pickering (1897); Nolan Lyons (1884)

In-universe information
- Full name: Enoch Malachi Thompson
- Nicknames: Nucky; Nuck; Gus
- Gender: Male
- Occupation: Treasurer of Atlantic County
- Family: Ethan Thompson (father/, deceased); Elias "Eli" Thompson (brother); Susan Thompson (sister, deceased)
- Spouses: Mabel Thompson (married 1897--deceased 1909); Margaret Thompson (married 1921--separated 1923)
- Significant others: Annabelle (1911-1917); Lucy Danziger (1917-1920); Billie Kent (1922-1923); Sally Wheet (1924-1931)
- Children: Enoch Jr. (deceased); Teddy Thompson (stepson); Emily Thompson (stepdaughter)
- Religion: Roman Catholic
- Nationality: Irish-American

Enoch Malachi "Nucky" Thompson is a fictional character and the protagonist of the HBO TV series Boardwalk Empire, portrayed by Steve Buscemi. Nucky is loosely based on former Atlantic City, New Jersey political figure Enoch Lewis "Nucky" Johnson.

Nucky is employed as treasurer of Atlantic County, but in effect controls the region as a political boss. He is a corrupt and powerful politician who leads a double life as a gangster, and continuously struggles to meet his interests on both fronts. Charming and intelligent, he is adored by the people of Atlantic City, especially its poor and immigrant inhabitants, for his numerous acts of charity. However, in private he has a tight grip on the city's politics and vice. Throughout the series he is portrayed as a Machiavellian politician who makes his henchmen do the dirty work, while showing a more humane side to his friends and family. However, by the end of season 2 he is shown becoming more ruthless in order to compete in the violent bootlegging business.

Buscemi won Best Actor in Dramatic Series at the 68th Golden Globe Awards for his performance as Nucky. In flashbacks throughout the fifth season, he is played by Nolan Lyons as a child and Marc Pickering as a young man.

== Fictional biography ==
Enoch "Nucky" Thompson was born around 1870 and raised in Atlantic City, New Jersey, the eldest child of a poor Irish Catholic family. His father Ethan was an abusive alcoholic who at one point scarred Nucky's hand with a fireplace poker. Nucky's sister Susan later died of tuberculosis. As a child, Nucky began working for local political boss Commodore Louis Kaestner (Dabney Coleman), who became his mentor in politics. For a time, Nucky attended New Jersey State Normal School in Trenton and planned on becoming a teacher. However, he left college and returned to Atlantic City, working his way up the ladder to become the deputy sheriff in the Commodore's political machine under the close watch of Sheriff Jacob Lindsay (Boris McGiver).

Nucky became sheriff after he arranged for the Commodore to rape Gillian Darmody (Gretchen Mol), who was only 13 years old at the time. Fifteen years prior to the series' timeline, Nucky lost his infant son, Enoch Jr., to pneumonia, a tragedy that drove his wife, Mabel, to kill herself. Nucky helped raise Jimmy Darmody (Michael Pitt), the Commodore's son with Gillian, and pulled strings to get him into Princeton University. He is disappointed when Jimmy drops out to enlist in World War I, but still gives him a job as his personal driver after the war ends. When Jimmy finds out that Nucky enabled the Commodore to rape Gillian, it creates a rift between them.

=== Season one ===
In the pilot episode, set the day before Prohibition is to take effect, Nucky – despite publicly supporting the ban of alcohol – conspires with other local politicians to profit from a bootlegging scheme. He is assisted by his younger brother, Atlantic County Sheriff Eli Thompson (Shea Whigham). Nucky makes a deal with mobsters Arnold Rothstein (Michael Stuhlbarg), Lucky Luciano (Vincent Piazza) and Johnny Torrio (Greg Antonacci) to let them purchase his seaborne liquor shipments exclusively. However, Jimmy conspires with Torrio's driver, Al Capone (Stephen Graham), to rob Nucky's shipment to Rothstein after the mobster takes Nucky's casino for over $90,000. The heist ends in bloodshed as Jimmy and Capone kill Rothstein's men. Nucky gets Jimmy out of trouble, while privately reproaching him and banishing him from Atlantic City. He later recruits Jimmy back from Chicago when Rothstein seeks revenge for the robbery. The truck heist also leads to Nucky being put under investigation by Nelson Van Alden (Michael Shannon), an agent from the Bureau of Prohibition who suspects he knows more about the hijacking than he admits.

Nucky meets Margaret Schroeder (Kelly Macdonald), a pregnant member of the Women's Temperance League who seeks work for her abusive husband, Hans (Joseph Sikora). Nucky is immediately taken with her and gives her some money. However, Hans gambles the money away, and subsequently beats Margaret so badly that she miscarries the child. Enraged, Nucky has Hans killed and framed for Jimmy's hijacking, and secures a job for Margaret at a boutique after she gets out of the hospital. Nucky and Margaret soon become lovers, and by the end of the season he informally adopts her children, Teddy and Emily. This creates tension between him and his former mistress, Lucy Danziger (Paz de la Huerta). Margaret eventually learns the extent of Nucky's corruption, including his order to have Hans killed. She leaves him after they have a heated argument. When Margaret finds out that Nucky had lost a child, however, she meets with him to express her sympathy, and he tells her that the time he spent with her and her children was the happiest of his life. Moved by his sincerity – and realizing that she and her children would likely starve without his support – Margaret renews their relationship.

Rothstein, seeking revenge for the robbery, employs the D'Alessio brothers to strike back at Nucky's enterprise. They first make their move by lynching a driver of Northside gangster Chalky White (Michael K. Williams), one of Nucky's partners. Sometime later, two of the brothers rob one of Nucky's aldermen, George O'Neill, in broad daylight on the boardwalk. Later, they rob Nucky's illegal casino, shooting Eli when he walks in on them. Nucky is forced to demote Eli while the heat blows over, and while he eventually reinstates his brother, their relationship is badly strained. A few days later, two of the D'Alessio brothers try to shoot Nucky as he and Margaret are walking down the boardwalk, but Nucky's butler, Eddie Kessler, deflects the gun away at the last second, and an innocent woman is shot in the shoulder. Nucky gets a break when Mickey Doyle, who has been partnered with the D'Alessios, double crosses them and gives information to Nucky about the conspiracy. Nucky has Chalky to arrange a false deal with Meyer Lansky in the hopes of luring the D'Alessios out of hiding. Chalky captures Lansky and two of the D'Alessios when they meet with him, including one of the would-be shooters from the attempt on Nucky's life. Both D'Alessios are killed and Lansky is allowed to leave with a message for Rothstein.

At the end of the season, Nucky and Rothstein come to a truce: all will be forgiven and Nucky will use his political connections to help Rothstein dodge a federal indictment for fixing the 1919 World Series in exchange for $1 million and for Rothstein giving up the remaining D'Alessio brothers, whom Nucky quickly has tracked down and killed. As Nucky rings in the new year of 1921 with Margaret at his side, Jimmy, Eli and the Commodore conspire to overthrow him and take over Atlantic City.

=== Season two ===
A few months later, Nucky is arrested for voter fraud concerning his behind-the-scenes role in the election of Mayor Edward L. Bader (Kevin O'Rourke), with corruption and murder charges soon to follow. Nucky suspects that the Commodore, Jimmy and Eli are plotting against him, a suspicion that is confirmed when his cronies defect to Jimmy's side. After the Commodore suffers a debilitating stroke, Eli panics and goes to Nucky for help, but Nucky gets into a violent argument with his brother and disowns him. Shortly afterward, one of Jimmy's men makes an attempt on Nucky's life.

Following his father's death, Nucky resigns as treasurer and tells Jimmy and the Commodore that they have won. It is a ruse, however; soon afterward, he sets in motion a plan to drive Jimmy and his partners out of business. He has his new driver, Owen Sleater (Charlie Cox), blow up the warehouse containing Jimmy's alcohol, and persuades Chalky to instigate a strike among the city's Black service workers, leaving the speakeasies and restaurants too understaffed to serve alcohol. Nucky then travels with Owen to Ireland to sell Thompson machine guns to the Irish Republican Army in exchange for Irish whiskey. Jimmy is left with no product or customers, while Nucky becomes the most powerful bootlegger in Atlantic City.

By this time, the U.S. Attorney's Office has found damning evidence of Nucky's crimes. Nucky gives Margaret temporary guardianship of a valuable piece of real estate so that she and the children will be taken care of should he go to prison. Emily contracts polio, which Margaret believes is divine retribution for their sins; she considers cleansing her soul by testifying against Nucky, which would send him to the electric chair. Nucky tells her that he wants to marry her and become a better man, while admitting that marrying her would make her unable to take the stand against him. The next day, Margaret sees him teaching Emily to walk in her leg braces and realizes that he loves her and her children. They get married that afternoon at Margaret's church.

Jimmy meets with Nucky to apologize for his treason, offering to help. On Nucky's order, Jimmy and Richard Harrow (Jack Huston) kill Alderman James Neary (Robert Clohessy), the prosecution's main witness. The U.S. Attorney's Office is forced to drop the charges. Nucky then visits Eli and makes him a deal: he will plead guilty to the voter fraud case and be sentenced to two years in prison, thus protecting Nucky from being charged again. That night, Nucky calls Jimmy and tells him that he has kidnapped Manny Horvitz (William Forsythe), the man who killed Jimmy's wife Angela (Aleksa Palladino). It is a trap, however, as Nucky actually plans to kill Jimmy as retaliation for an assassination attempt that Jimmy had ordered on him earlier in the season. Jimmy realizes that he's walking into a trap, and as such shows up to the meeting unarmed. Nucky's men hold him at gunpoint, and Nucky shoots him twice in the head, killing him. The next day, Nucky lies to Margaret about reconciling with Jimmy, a lie she immediately sees through. To punish him, Margaret signs over the deed to his real estate – which he had planned to use in a lucrative road construction deal – to her church.

=== Season three ===
At the start of 1923, Nucky faces trouble from Gyp Rosetti (Bobby Cannavale), a New York gangster who works for Joe Masseria (Ivo Nandi). Due to political turmoil involving U.S. Attorney General Harry M. Daugherty (Christopher McDonald), whom Nucky pays $40,000 a month to protect him from any criminal investigations, Nucky agrees to simplify his operation and sell exclusively to Rothstein. Infuriated, Rosetti takes over Tabor Heights, a small town on the road between Atlantic City and New York where convoys stop for gas. He then blockades any of Nucky's alcohol deliveries from going through. The feud escalates when Rosetti hijacks a convoy, killing eleven of Nucky's men. Rothstein sends Benjamin Siegel (Michael Zegen) to kill Rosetti, but the hit is unsuccessful. However, it does force Rosetti to flee Tabor Heights and go back to New York.

Back home, Nucky's marriage to Margaret is now no more than a public show, and Nucky spends much of his time in Manhattan with his mistress Billie Kent (Meg Chambers Steedle). When Eli is released from prison, Nucky gives him a job in a liquor warehouse, but wants nothing to do with him personally. This changes when Eli tries and fails to stop one of Nucky's convoys from being ambushed by Rosetti's men. After an Easter dinner with the family, Nucky reconciles with Eli, and they go back to working together.

In Washington, D. C., Daugherty plans to indict Nucky for bootlegging to make him a scapegoat for the corruption charges facing the Harding Administration. Nucky goes to Treasury Secretary Andrew Mellon (James Cromwell) and convinces him to have George Remus (Glenn Fleshler) arrested in exchange for Nucky illegally running Mellon's distillery in West Overton, Pennsylvania. Remus has direct ties to Daugherty's accomplice Jess Smith (Ed Jewett), causing further problems for Daugherty and leaving Nucky in the clear.

Rosetti convinces Masseria to provide him with extra men to take over Atlantic City. Acting on a tip from Gillian, who wants revenge for Jimmy's murder, Rosetti bombs Nucky's favorite restaurant in order to kill him, Rothstein and Luciano. All three survive the explosion, but Billie is killed and Nucky is left with temporary tinnitus. Nucky organizes a meeting with the East Coast crime bosses to seek support for killing both Rosetti and Masseria. Everyone at the meeting declines, however, and the job is left to Owen. However, Luciano and Lansky alert Masseria to Nucky's attempted hit in exchange for Masseria financing their heroin operation. As Owen enters a Turkish bathhouse to murder Masseria, the crime lord's men ambush and kill him and shipped back to Nucky in a crate. From Margaret's grief-stricken reaction to Owen's death, Nucky deduces that the two had been having an affair.

Nucky narrowly escapes an attempt on his life by Masseria's men, killing his would-be assailants (although not before Eddie is wounded), and recruits Chalky and Capone to provide men to fight back against Rosetti. An all-out gang war ensues, with massive casualties on both sides. Rothstein tries to convince Masseria to end his support for Rosetti in exchange for Nucky giving up 99% of the profits from Mellon's distillery. The agreement is a trap, however; as part of his deal with Nucky, Mellon has Rothstein arrested. Chalky and Capone send their men to ambush and massacre Masseria's men as they are withdrawing from Atlantic City. Meanwhile, Harrow unexpectedly storms the Artemis Club, massacring Rosetti's men and managing to rescue Tommy Darmody, who is held at gunpoint. Rosetti and two of his men are able to escape. While searching the club afterwards, Nucky and Eli find Rosetti's right-hand man Tonino Sandrelli (Chris Caldovino) hiding in a closet, and get him to kill Rosetti in exchange for sparing his life. Nucky tries to reconcile with Margaret, who has left him and taken the children. Margaret rebuffs him, however, and refuses to accept money from him.

=== Season four ===
In 1924, Nucky has made peace with Masseria and Rothstein, and is a silent partner in Chalky's nightclub on the Boardwalk. He travels to Tampa, Florida to look into investing in a distillery run by Bill McCoy (Pearce Bunting), but rejects the deal, believing the location is too high-profile. He changes his mind and becomes part owner, unaware that McCoy has killed one of his investors. He also takes on Luciano and Lansky as partners in the distillery. While in Florida, he begins an affair with speakeasy owner Sally Wheet (Patricia Arquette).

Nucky's empire faces a new threat in Bureau of Investigation Agent James Tolliver (Brian Geraghty), who infiltrates his distribution network by posing as a corrupt Prohibition agent. When Nucky sends Eddie to New York Penn Station to deliver money to Ralph Capone (Domenick Lombardozzi), Tolliver detains and blackmails him into revealing Nucky's arrangement with the Capones. Eddie returns to Nucky's house and commits suicide. Days later, Nucky has an uneasy reunion with Margaret and tells her of Eddie's death. Meanwhile, Nucky gets Eli's son Willie (Ben Rosenfield) off a murder charge by framing his college roommate and bribing the Philadelphia district attorney. Nucky gets Willie a job in the mayor's office. Tolliver finds out the truth, however, and tells Eli he will put Willie in prison unless he informs on Nucky. Eli becomes Tolliver's spy, and arranges for Nucky to attend a meeting with Masseria in which both will be arrested.

Chalky asks for Nucky's backing in a war with heroin kingpin Valentin Narcisse (Jeffrey Wright). Nucky refuses to get involved, but Chalky becomes more insistent after Narcisse tries to kill him and brutalizes his mistress, Daughter Maitland (Margot Bingham). Nucky learns that Lansky is smuggling Narcisse's heroin on Masseria's orders and meets with Masseria and Narcisse in order to get his cut of the profits. Nucky orders Bader to have two sheriff's deputies drive Chalky to Philadelphia, but Bader is now supporting Narcisse and orders the deputies to kill Chalky. They fail, however, and Chalky shows up at Nucky's door demanding answers. To make amends, Nucky orders Harrow to kill Narcisse, and in return pulls strings to have Gillian convicted of murder so Harrow can take custody of Tommy. The hit goes awry, and Harrow and Chalky's daughter are killed.

Nucky begins to suspect that Eli is informing on him, and cancels the meeting with Masseria. He arranges to go with Sally to Cuba, but first confronts Eli. Nucky pulls a gun on his brother, but after Willie walks in and Eli reveals Tolliver's blackmail, Nucky cannot bring himself to pull the trigger. When Eli kills Tolliver, Nucky sends him to Chicago under Capone's protection and goes to Cuba with Sally.

=== Season five ===
In 1931, Nucky travels between Cuba, New York and New Jersey, planning to go into the legal liquor business in anticipation of the end of Prohibition. In Cuba, he bumps on Meyer Lansky and an attempt is made on his life afterwards. He suspects that Luciano and Lansky are behind it. This forces him to travel to New York, where he confronts Luciano's boss, Salvatore Maranzano. He also tries to start a partnership with Mayflower Grain Inc., but they turn him down. Desperate, he tries to convince Joseph Kennedy (Matt Letscher) to get involved in the legal liquor business in Cuba, but Kennedy declines. Nucky goes back to Atlantic City, where he befriends a bellboy named Joe Harper (Travis Tope), who reminds him of himself as a young man. Meanwhile, Margaret visits him for the first time in years to ask for his help in dealing with Rothstein's widow, who is blackmailing her. He gives her money in return for her help in driving down stock prices for Mayflower, where she now works. Soon afterward, Sally is murdered by Havana police and Nucky is informed by Capone that Luciano has betrayed Maranzano and wants Nucky himself killed.

Nucky goes to meet with Maranzano, in hopes of joining forces with him against Luciano, but he ends up surviving another attempt on his life, this time backed by his old friend Torrio. Nucky declares war on him and Luciano. He has Siegel kidnapped to force a meeting with Luciano and Lansky, who kidnap Willie in retaliation. At the meeting, Luciano threatens to kill Willie. Desperate to save his nephew, Nucky gives Luciano control of his empire in Atlantic City and arranges to have Maranzano killed. That night, he receives a letter from Gillian, who is now in a sanitorium, begging him for help.

In the series finale, Nucky short sells Mayflower's stock with Margaret's help, and he makes a huge profit. He plans to leave Atlantic City forever, and says goodbye to Eli, leaving him with a bag of money. He refuses to help Gillian get out of the sanatorium but offers to establish a trust fund for her should she get out on her own.

On Nucky's last night in Atlantic City, he gets a call from the police, who have arrested Harper. Nucky bails him out and offers to give him money, but Harper angrily rejects the gesture. Hours later, Harper confronts Nucky and reveals who he truly is; Tommy Darmody, Jimmy Darmody's son and Gillian's grandson. Tommy accuses Nucky of betraying Gillian and guns him down. Nucky dies as IRS agents, who had followed him the entire evening, identify themselves and arrest Tommy. The arrival of the agents is a reference to the eventual fate of the real Enoch Johnson, who was imprisoned in 1941 on tax evasion charges.

== Casting ==
In casting the role of Nucky Thompson (based upon real-life Atlantic City political boss Enoch L. Johnson), Winter wanted to stray from the real life of Johnson as much as possible. "If we were going to cast accurately what the real Nucky looked like, we'd have cast Jim Gandolfini." The idea of casting Steve Buscemi in the lead role came about when Scorsese mentioned wanting to work with the actor, whom Winter knew well having worked with him on The Sopranos. Winter sent the script out to Buscemi, who responded very enthusiastically. "I just thought, 'Wow. I'm almost sorry I've read this, because if I don't get it, I'm going to be so sad.' My response was 'Terry, I know you're looking at other actors'... and he said, 'No, no, Steve, I said we want you.'" Explained Scorsese, "I love the range he has, his dramatic sense, but also his sense of humor."

== Reception ==
Buscemi has won and been nominated for several awards for his portrayal of Nucky Thompson. He was nominated for a Primetime Emmy Award for Outstanding Lead Actor in a Drama Series Award at the 63rd and 64th Primetime Emmy Awards. In addition, Buscemi won Best Actor in Dramatic Series at the 68th Golden Globe Awards, while also getting nominated at the 69th and 70th Awards. The cast won the Screen Actors Guild Award for Outstanding Performance by an Ensemble in a Drama Series at the 17th and 18th Screen Actors Guild Awards while being nominated at the 19th, 20th and 21st. Buscemi won the Screen Actors Guild Award for Outstanding Performance by a Male Actor in a Drama Series two years in a row from 2011 to 2012, while also being nominated in 2013, 2014 and 2015.
