= Gyp Rosetti =

Boardwalk Empire character

- Boardwalk Empire character
- Promo image of Gyp Rosetti from season 3 of Boardwalk Empire.
- First appearance: "Resolution"
- Last appearance: "Margate Sands"
- Created by: Terence Winter
- Portrayed by: Bobby Cannavale

In-universe information
- Full name: Giuseppe Colombano Rosetti
- Nickname: Gyp, "D.L. Collingsworth", The Gypsy
- Occupation: Capo for the Masseria crime family
- Spouse: Giaconda Rosetti (?-1923)
- Significant other: Roberta; Gillian Darmody
- Nationality: Italian-American

Giuseppe Colombano "Gyp" Rosetti is a character in the HBO TV series Boardwalk Empire, portrayed by Bobby Cannavale. Rosetti is a New York City gangster who works for Joe Masseria (Ivo Nandi). Hot-headed, easily offended and prone to bouts of extreme violence, he is the primary antagonist of the series’ third season.

== Fictional biography ==
Rosetti was born in Sperlinga, a small Italian comune in Sicily. He grew up in poverty, living in a hut carved into a cave. His father was a bricklayer who died when he was 50. Rosetti eventually emigrated to the United States and began working for Italian mob boss Joe Masseria. He runs brothels, speakeasies and illegal gambling dens in southern Manhattan. He lives in an apartment with his wife, two daughters and mother-in-law. Although Rosetti regularly kills people over slight insults, he does not retaliate when his wife and mother-in-law openly mock him. He is also depicted as having sadomasochistic sexual tastes; he has one of his lovers choke him with a belt while he masturbates, and has another insult him as a form of foreplay.

=== Season 3 ===
Rosetti is introduced beating a good samaritan to death with a tire iron for making an off-handed comment about Rosetti not knowing what 3-in-One Oil is. He travels to Atlantic City on New Year's Eve (December 31, 1922) in order to purchase a large quantity of bootlegged liquor from Nucky. In order to simplify his operations and keep the law at bay, Nucky decides to sell alcohol exclusively to Arnold Rothstein (Michael Stuhlbarg). Rosetti, anticipating a 50% price markup if he were to purchase from Rothstein, curses Nucky and leaves for New York City. He then takes over the small town of Tabor Heights and blockades Nucky's shipment heading to Rothstein in New York. Since Tabor Heights sits on the only road suitable for winter travel between Atlantic City and New York and is the last spot to fill up on gas on the way, Nucky has no way to deliver his alcohol. Nucky eventually makes a truce with Rosetti, selling him alcohol, and Rosetti leaves Tabor Heights. However, Rosetti changes his mind when he perceives Nucky's departing message, "buona fortuna", Italian for "good luck" — as an insult. This escalates, with Rosetti choosing to burn the Sheriff of Tabor Heights alive, then ambush a convoy transporting liquor to Rothstein, killing 11 of Nucky's men (in spite of Eli scouting out the town in advance). Rothstein responds by sending Benjamin Siegel (Michael Zegen) to kill Rosetti. Although Siegel fails to kill Rosetti, he does kill four of Rosetti's men and a waitress Rosetti had been having sex with, which causes Rosetti to leave Tabor Heights and return to New York.

On Easter Sunday, Rosetti's second-in-command Tonino Sandrelli (Chris Caldovino) informs him of all the territory they lost in New York City because of their long absence. After dinner, Rosetti goes to church, where he chastises God for the life he was given. He then beats up a priest and steals the church donations. Masseria is upset with Rosetti's long absence and gives the order to kill Rosetti. As Masseria's men get up, Rosetti tells Masseria that his own losses are nothing compared to all that Masseria can lose from Nucky and Rothstein partnering together. Rosetti is able to convince Masseria to spare his life and provide him with additional men to kill both Nucky and Rothstein and take over Atlantic City.

Rosetti is able to start his own illegal alcohol import business and take over the rackets of Atlantic City. He makes a move to kill Nucky, Rothstein and Charlie Luciano (Vincent Piazza); on a tip from Gillian Darmody, he blows up Babette's supper club, but all three men survive. A gang war soon erupts between Nucky and Rosetti, with dozens of casualties on both sides, including Nucky's top enforcer Owen Sleater (Charlie Cox). Rosetti and his men then take up residence in Gillian's brothel, planning to eventually take it over. Rosetti's men soon come after Nucky himself, but he escapes and seeks protection from Northside leader Chalky White (Michael K. Williams). Rosetti tries to persuade White to surrender Nucky, but White denies knowing his whereabouts. White agrees to support Nucky and is able to fight back against Rosetti with Al Capone's (Stephen Graham) support.

That night, Rosetti is about to have sex with Gillian, who tries to inject him with heroin so she can render him helpless and kill him. He realizes what she is doing just in time, however, and overpowers her, injecting her during the struggle. Moments later, Masseria's men head back to New York, as Nucky and Rothstein have struck a deal wherein Rothstein convinces Masseria to withdraw his support from Rosetti in exchange for taking over operation of the Overholt distillery. Men working for White's and Capone's gangs ambush and kill Masseria's men as they leave town, while Richard Harrow (Jack Huston) shows up at the brothel to rescue Gillian's grandson Tommy, and kills most of Rosetti's men in the process with the exception of Rosetti, Tonino, and two of his guards. Nucky and Eli find Tonino in the aftermath of the massacre, and agree to let him live on the condition that he kill Rosetti. He convenes with Rosetti and the other two guards at a beach, and while Rosetti is relieving himself, Tonino stabs Rosetti in the back, then again in the chest, killing him. Tonino then takes Rosetti's body back to New York City.

== Reception ==
The role received critical acclaim and earned Cannavale the Primetime Emmy Award for Outstanding Supporting Actor in a Drama Series in 2013. He was also nominated along with the rest of the cast for the Screen Actors Guild Award for Outstanding Performance by an Ensemble in a Drama Series. Rosetti was named "Best TV Villain" of 2012 by IGN. Additionally, he has been ranked #12 by Rolling Stone among the "40 Greatest TV Villains of All Time".
