= List of Boardwalk Empire episodes =

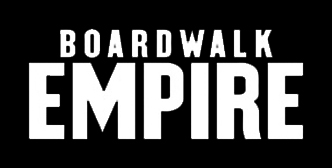

Boardwalk Empire is an American period crime drama television series created by Terence Winter for HBO. It is based on the book Boardwalk Empire: The Birth, High Times and Corruption of Atlantic City by Nelson Johnson. Set in Atlantic City, New Jersey, during the Prohibition era, the series stars Steve Buscemi as Enoch "Nucky" Thompson (based on the historical Enoch L. Johnson), a political figure who rose to prominence and controlled Atlantic City, New Jersey, during the Prohibition period of the 1920s and 1930s.

The series received widespread critical acclaim, winning various awards including Golden Globe Awards for Best Drama Series and Best Actor in a Television Drama Series for Buscemi for its first season.

During the course of the series, 56 episodes of Boardwalk Empire aired over five seasons, between September 19, 2010, and October 26, 2014.

== Series overview ==
Season	Episodes	Originally released		Average viewership (in millions)
Season	Episodes	First released	Last released	Average viewership (in millions)
1	12	September 19, 2010	December 5, 2010	3.17
2	12	September 25, 2011	December 11, 2011	2.73
3	12	September 16, 2012	December 2, 2012	2.32
4	12	September 8, 2013	November 24, 2013	2.05
5	8	September 7, 2014	October 26, 2014	2.01

== Episodes ==
=== Season 1 (2010) ===
No. overall	No. in season	Title	Directed by	Written by	Original release date	US viewers (millions)
1	1	"Boardwalk Empire"	Martin Scorsese	Terence Winter	September 19, 2010	4.81
2	2	"The Ivory Tower"	Tim Van Patten	Terence Winter	September 26, 2010	3.33
3	3	"Broadway Limited"	Tim Van Patten	Margaret Nagle	October 3, 2010	3.41
4	4	"Anastasia"	Jeremy Podeswa	Lawrence Konner & Margaret Nagle	October 10, 2010	2.57
5	5	"Nights in Ballygran"	Alan Taylor	Lawrence Konner	October 17, 2010	2.85
6	6	"Family Limitation"	Tim Van Patten	Howard Korder	October 24, 2010	2.81
7	7	"Home"	Allen Coulter	Tim Van Patten & Paul Simms	October 31, 2010	2.67
8	8	"Hold Me in Paradise"	Brian Kirk	Meg Jackson	November 7, 2010	3.21
9	9	"Belle Femme"	Brad Anderson	Steve Kornacki	November 14, 2010	2.98
10	10	"The Emerald City"	Simon Cellan Jones	Lawrence Konner	November 21, 2010	3.05
11	11	"Paris Green"	Allen Coulter	Howard Korder	November 28, 2010	3.00
12	12	"A Return to Normalcy"	Tim Van Patten	Terence Winter	December 5, 2010	3.29

=== Season 2 (2011) ===
No. overall	No. in season	Title	Directed by	Written by	Original release date	US viewers (millions)
13	1	"21"	Tim Van Patten	Terence Winter	September 25, 2011	2.91
14	2	"Ourselves Alone"	David Petrarca	Howard Korder	October 2, 2011	2.59
15	3	"A Dangerous Maid"	Susanna White	Itamar Moses	October 9, 2011	2.86
16	4	"What Does the Bee Do?"	Ed Bianchi	Steve Kornacki	October 16, 2011	2.55
17	5	"Gimcrack & Bunkum"	Tim Van Patten	Howard Korder	October 23, 2011	2.69
18	6	"The Age of Reason"	Jeremy Podeswa	Bathsheba Doran	October 30, 2011	2.63
19	7	"Peg of Old"	Allen Coulter	Howard Korder & Steve Kornacki & Bathsheba Doran	November 6, 2011	2.74
20	8	"Two Boats and a Lifeguard"	Tim Van Patten	Terence Winter	November 13, 2011	2.54
21	9	"Battle of the Century"	Brad Anderson	Steve Kornacki	November 20, 2011	2.55
22	10	"Georgia Peaches"	Jeremy Podeswa	Dave Flebotte	November 27, 2011	2.73
23	11	"Under God's Power She Flourishes"	Allen Coulter	Howard Korder	December 4, 2011	2.97
24	12	"To the Lost"	Tim Van Patten	Terence Winter	December 11, 2011	3.01

=== Season 3 (2012) ===
No. overall	No. in season	Title	Directed by	Written by	Original release date	US viewers (millions)
25	1	"Resolution"	Tim Van Patten	Terence Winter	September 16, 2012	2.89
26	2	"Spaghetti & Coffee"	Alik Sakharov	Howard Korder	September 23, 2012	2.62
27	3	"Bone for Tuna"	Jeremy Podeswa	Chris Haddock	September 30, 2012	2.36
28	4	"Blue Bell Boy"	Kari Skogland	David Stenn	October 7, 2012	2.11
29	5	"You'd Be Surprised"	Tim Van Patten	Diane Frolov & Andrew Schneider	October 14, 2012	2.19
30	6	"Ging Gang Goolie"	Ed Bianchi	Steve Kornacki	October 21, 2012	2.34
31	7	"Sunday Best"	Allen Coulter	Howard Korder	October 28, 2012	1.97
32	8	"The Pony"	Tim Van Patten	Terence Winter and Howard Korder	November 4, 2012	2.09
33	9	"The Milkmaid's Lot"	Ed Bianchi	Rolin Jones	November 11, 2012	2.06
34	10	"A Man, a Plan..."	Jeremy Podeswa	Dave Flebotte	November 18, 2012	2.18
35	11	"Two Imposters"	Allen Coulter	Howard Korder	November 25, 2012	2.30
36	12	"Margate Sands"	Tim Van Patten	Terence Winter and Howard Korder	December 2, 2012	2.73

=== Season 4 (2013) ===
No. overall	No. in season	Title	Directed by	Written by	Original release date	US viewers (millions)
37	1	"New York Sour"	Tim Van Patten	Howard Korder	September 8, 2013	2.38
38	2	"Resignation"	Alik Sakharov	Dennis Lehane and Howard Korder	September 15, 2013	2.21
39	3	"Acres of Diamonds"	Allen Coulter	Terence Winter	September 22, 2013	1.87
40	4	"All In"	Ed Bianchi	David Matthews	September 29, 2013	1.99
41	5	"Erlkönig"	Tim Van Patten	Howard Korder	October 6, 2013	2.09
42	6	"The North Star"	Allen Coulter	Eric Overmyer and Howard Korder	October 13, 2013	1.90
43	7	"William Wilson"	Jeremy Podeswa	David Matthews and Terence Winter	October 20, 2013	2.16
44	8	"The Old Ship of Zion"	Tim Van Patten	Cristine Chambers and Howard Korder	October 27, 2013	1.91
45	9	"Marriage and Hunting"	Ed Bianchi	David Matthews & Jennifer Ames & Steve Turner	November 3, 2013	1.90
46	10	"White Horse Pike"	Jake Paltrow	Dave Flebotte	November 10, 2013	2.08
47	11	"Havre de Grace"	Allen Coulter	Howard Korder	November 17, 2013	1.98
48	12	"Farewell Daddy Blues"	Tim Van Patten	Terence Winter and Howard Korder	November 24, 2013	2.18

=== Season 5 (2014) ===
No. overall	No. in season	Title	Directed by	Written by	Original release date	US viewers (millions)
49	1	"Golden Days for Boys and Girls"	Tim Van Patten	Howard Korder	September 7, 2014	2.37
50	2	"The Good Listener"	Allen Coulter	Terence Winter	September 14, 2014	1.81
51	3	"What Jesus Said"	Ed Bianchi	Cristine Chambers & Howard Korder	September 21, 2014	2.11
52	4	"Cuanto"	Jake Paltrow	Howard Korder & Cristine Chambers & Terence Winter	September 28, 2014	2.05
53	5	"King of Norway"	Ed Bianchi	Steve Kornacki	October 5, 2014	1.94
54	6	"Devil You Know"	Jeremy Podeswa	Howard Korder	October 12, 2014	1.55
55	7	"Friendless Child"	Allen Coulter	Riccardo DiLoreto & Cristine Chambers and Howard Korder	October 19, 2014	1.95
56	8	"Eldorado"	Tim Van Patten	Howard Korder & Terence Winter	October 26, 2014	2.33

== Ratings ==
Boardwalk Empire : U.S. viewers per episode (millions)

Season	Episode number											
Season	1	2	3	4	5	6	7	8	9	10	11	12
1	4.81	3.33	3.41	2.57	2.85	2.81	2.67	3.21	2.98	3.05	3.00	3.29
2	2.91	2.59	2.86	2.55	2.69	2.63	2.74	2.54	2.55	2.73	2.97	3.01
3	2.89	2.62	2.36	2.11	2.19	2.34	1.97	2.09	2.06	2.18	2.30	2.73
4	2.38	2.21	1.87	1.99	2.09	1.90	2.16	1.91	1.90	2.08	1.98	2.18
5	2.37	1.81	2.11	2.05	1.94	1.55	1.95	2.33	–			

Audience measurement performed by Nielsen Media Research

== Home video releases ==
Season	Episodes	DVD and Blu-ray release dates		
Season	Episodes	Region 1	Region 2	Region 4
1	12	January 10, 2012	January 9, 2012	January 11, 2012
2	12	August 28, 2012	September 3, 2012	September 5, 2012
3	12	August 20, 2013	August 5, 2013	August 21, 2013
4	12	August 19, 2014	August 18, 2014	August 27, 2014
5	8	January 13, 2015	January 12, 2015	January 14, 2015
Total	56	May 19, 2015	TBA	TBA
