= Cuanto (Boardwalk Empire) =

- Boardwalk Empire episode
- Episode no.: Season 5 Episode 4
- Directed by: Jake Paltrow
- Written by: Howard Korder; Christine Chambers; Terence Winter
- Cinematography by: Bill Coleman
- Editing by: Tim Streeto; Perri B. Frank
- Original air date: September 28, 2014
- Running time: 59 minutes

Guest appearances
- Patricia Arquette as Sally Wheet; Ian Hart as Ethan Thompson; Boris McGiver as Sheriff Jacob Lindsay; Domenick Lombardozzi as Ralph Capone; Matt Letscher as Joe Kennedy; John Ellison Conlee as Commodore Louis Kaestner; Erin Dilly as Elenore Thompson; Travis Tope as Joe Harper; Louis Cancelmi as Mike D'Angelo; Paul Calderón as Arquimedes; Michael Countryman as Frank Wilson; Nolan Lyons as Young Nucky Thompson; Oakes Fegley as Young Eli Thompson; Edward Carnevale as Cenzo; Jorge Pupo as The Bank Manager

Episode chronology
← Previous "What Jesus Said"	Next → "King of Norway"
- Boardwalk Empire (season 5)

"Cuanto" is the fourth episode of the fifth season of the American period crime drama television series Boardwalk Empire. It is the 52nd overall episode of the series and was written by executive producer Howard Korder, Christine Chambers, and series creator Terence Winter, and directed by Jake Paltrow. It was released on HBO on September 28, 2014.

The series is set in Atlantic City, New Jersey, during the Prohibition era of the 1920s. The series follows Enoch "Nucky" Thompson, a political figure who rises to prominence and interacts with mobsters, politicians, government agents, and the common folk who look up to him. In the episode, Nucky and Margaret reunite, while Luciano suspects about Van Alden's previous life in Atlantic City.

According to Nielsen Media Research, the episode was seen by an estimated 2.05 million household viewers and gained a 0.8 ratings share among adults aged 18–49. The episode received mostly positive reviews from critics, who praised the performances (particularly Buscemi and Macdonald) and storylines.

== Plot ==
=== 1884 ===
The Commodore fires Nucky from the Corner Hotel as he starts planning the construction of a larger boardwalk in the area so Nucky can attend school. Later, Nucky takes Eli to the Corner Hotel with a stolen key, where they use one of the luxury rooms. They are eventually caught and taken away by Sheriff Lindsay. Taking pity on the boys, he decides to invite them to dine with his family. Nucky enjoys the evening, although he cries due to his life back home. Lindsay drives the boys home, telling him he can help him in anything.

=== 1931 ===
As his flight to Cuba is canceled due to bad weather, Nucky catches up with Margaret. She explains her association with Rothstein and that Carolyn plans to sue her unless she gives her the money that Rothstein provided. They are later visited by Joe Kennedy, who informs Nucky that he will not get into business with him. Nucky is not bothered by the news, and he reconciles with Margaret over dinner. During a walk in the boardwalk, they kiss, and Nucky states that he will help Margaret in dealing with Carolyn.

In Chicago, because of his huge ego, Capone is delighted to see a newsreel describing many of his actions, which includes the murders of Dean O'Banion and Hymie Weiss, and the Saint Valentine's Day Massacre on his orders. Luciano is visiting, but finds himself confused with Van Alden, believing he saw him before. Later, he informs Capone about Van Alden's previous position as a Prohibition agent. Capone interrogates Van Alden at gunpoint; Van Alden reminds Capone of his loyalty to him through everything he did, as well as to indicate Luciano disrespected him by telling Capone on what to do in his own city. Convinced, Capone spares his life. Later, in a sudden fit of rage, Capone kills one of his henchmen to take out his anger over Luciano’s disrespect.

In Cuba, Sally is called by Nucky to explain his absence, and is advised to take care of the business for the moment. She collects debts through the city in order to pay for protection of their business. At the Havana border, she is stopped by a military patrol due to a curfew. She is then arrested when she tries to bribe the officer, and the soldier also confiscates her gun. Desperate, she grabs a gun from a soldier, but is shot and killed by another soldier.

== Production ==
=== Development ===
In August 2014, HBO confirmed that the fourth episode of the season would be titled "Cuanto", and that it would be written by executive producer Howard Korder, Christine Chambers, and series creator Terence Winter, and directed by Jake Paltrow. This was Korder's 21st writing credit, Chambers' third writing credit, Winter's 14th writing credit, and Paltrow's second directing credit.

== Reception ==
=== Viewers ===
In its original American broadcast, "Cuanto" was seen by an estimated 2.05 million household viewers with a 0.8 in the 18-49 demographics. This means that 0.8 percent of all households with televisions watched the episode. This was a slight decrease in viewership from the previous episode, which was watched by 2.11 million household viewers with a 0.9 in the 18-49 demographics.

=== Critical reviews ===
"Cuanto" received mostly positive reviews from critics. The review aggregator website Rotten Tomatoes reported an 92% approval rating for the episode, based on 13 reviews. The site's consensus states: "Thanks to a few key scenes and poignant character moments, 'Cuanto' is both emotionally satisfying and fraught with enough compelling tension to keep Boardwalk Empire's final season interesting."

Matt Fowler of IGN gave the episode a "great" 8.4 out of 10 and wrote in his verdict, "Nucky's flashbacks and his moments with Margaret helped steer an episode full of easily telegraphed violence. Mueller being recognized by Luciano also made for an excellent callback to earlier events. But Sally seemed to be sacrificed in the name of a rum deal that was never, historically, meant to be and Capone's violent mania is nowhere near as interesting as the show thinks it is."

Alan Sepinwall of HitFix wrote, "'Cuanto' was an excellent episode. Now we approach the endgame. I look forward to it." Genevieve Valentine of The A.V. Club gave the episode a "B+" grade and wrote, "It's the least surprising thing in the world that Sally dies this week. This is a season of wrapping up loose ends, and she's always been one. The Havana plotline was at such an obvious distance from the heart of the action, geographically and otherwise, that it had run its course, and with Margaret back, Sally was not going to be long at Nucky's side."

Sarene Leeds of Entertainment Weekly wrote, "The HBO drama has not made it easy for fans to remain faithful for all four and a half seasons, given its tendency to kill off favorite characters and muddle its story lines with tiresome plots concerning whiny, talent-free showgirls or whiny, insecure college kids. However, series creator Terence Winter rewarded those who have stuck by the Atlantic City gangsters since season 1 with 'Cuanto,' an episode that brought us the return of OG 'partners in crime' Nucky Thompson and Margaret Rohan-Schroeder-Thompson, as well as the unraveling of Nelson Van Alden's decade-long evasion from the feds." Craig D. Lindsey of Vulture gave the episode a 3 star rating out of 5 and wrote, "The scenes with Buscemi and Macdonald had a quippy, Hawksian crackle to them as they went back and forth with dialogue that either dripped with sarcasm or malice. Their chemistry was so palpable, it seemed obvious that they would get back together especially after Margaret laid a big, drunken wet one on Nucky on the boardwalk."

Rodrigo Perez of IndieWire wrote, "this episode of Boardwalk Empire elegantly unfurls the flashback's of Nucky's youth and there's a lot of nuance and sweetness throughout the episode." Chris O'Hara of TV Fanatic gave the episode a perfect 5 star rating out of 5 and wrote, "The scenes featuring young Nucky this week on 'Cuanto' actually shed a great deal of light on what seems to be driving Nucky presently."

Tony Sokol of Den of Geek gave the episode a perfect 5 star rating out of 5 and wrote, "The pacing was perfect. Boardwalk Empire has a certain rhythm, each episode breathes, but even when it makes the audience gasp, it never loses its breath. A great episode even when compared to other great Boardwalk Empire episodes." Paste gave the episode a 7.6 out of 10 rating and wrote, "It's typical of Boardwalk Empire's fifth season that some material is spectacular, and some is outright bad. But I have to give the show credit for making the good so very good this time out."
