= Friendless Child =

- Boardwalk Empire episode
- Episode no.: Season 5 Episode 7
- Directed by: Allen Coulter
- Written by: Riccardo DiLoreto; Christine Chambers; Howard Korder
- Cinematography by: Eric Moynier
- Editing by: Kate Sanford
- Original air date: October 19, 2014
- Running time: 57 minutes

Guest appearances
- Anatol Yusef as Meyer Lansky; Marc Pickering as Young Nucky Thompson; Boris McGiver as Sheriff Jacob Lindsay; John Ellison Conlee as Commodore Louis Kaestner; Greg Antonacci as Johnny Torrio; Michael Zegen as Bugsy Siegel; Paul Calderón as Arquimedes; Travis Tope as Joe Harper; Louis Cancelmi as Mike D'Angelo; Giampiero Judica as Salvatore Maranzano; Michael Countryman as Frank Wilson; Reg Rogers as Robert Hodge; Maya Kazan as Young Mabel Jeffries

Episode chronology
← Previous "Devil You Know"	Next → "Eldorado"
- Boardwalk Empire (season 5)

"Friendless Child" is the seventh episode of the fifth season of the American period crime drama television series Boardwalk Empire. It is the 55th overall episode of the series and was written by Riccardo DiLoreto, Christine Chambers, and executive producer Howard Korder, and directed by producer Allen Coulter. It was released on HBO on October 19, 2014.

The series is set in Atlantic City, New Jersey, during the Prohibition era of the 1920s. The series follows Enoch "Nucky" Thompson, a political figure who rises to prominence and interacts with mobsters, politicians, government agents, and the common folk who look up to him. In the episode, Nucky's war with Luciano escalates, while his past with Gillian is revealed.

According to Nielsen Media Research, the episode was seen by an estimated 1.95 million household viewers and gained a 0.8 ratings share among adults aged 18–49. The episode received critical acclaim, with critics praising the flashback sequences, performances and writing.

== Plot ==
=== 1897 ===
Nucky decides to take Gillian to his house instead of arresting her. Mabel cares for Gillian and gets her to work in the house. Despite Gillian having a bad experience at the orphanage, Nucky decides that she should return anyway. He later meets with Sheriff Lindsay to meet with the Commodore, where Lindsay announces his retirement, having had enough of serving the Commodore. Nucky is then tasked by the Commodore in taking a young girl home, as she did not please him, making him realize that the Commodore is a child molester. He returns home, discovering that Gillian has fled, devastating Mabel. They then get into an argument when Nucky only views Gillian as a thief.

=== 1931 ===
In Chicago, D'Angelo and his partner, Frank Wilson, convince a judge in granting them an arrest warrant for Capone, as they have enough evidence to convict him for tax evasion.

The war between Nucky and Luciano escalates into Atlantic City, ending with many pedestrians dead. Nucky wants to make a bigger push, but Maranzano wants to take a more cautious approach, believing patience will earn them victory in the long run. Nucky ignores Maranzano’s advice and has Arquimedes kidnap Siegel. Nucky talks with Luciano into setting a meeting to release Siegel, but Luciano rejects the meeting.

In New York City, Willie is visited by Eli, having fled Chicago. Eli wants to reconcile, but Willie is not interested. As Eli leaves, he sees Willie kidnapped by Luciano's henchmen. Luciano then calls Nucky, warning him that he will kill Willie if anything happens to Siegel. They schedule a meeting outside Atlantic City where they will exchange Siegel and Willie. However, Luciano retrieves Siegel and refuses to let Willie go unless Nucky hands over his assets. Mickey tries to charm Luciano, but a fed up Luciano shoots him in the throat, killing him as well as Arquimedes. Nucky then offers every single one of his assets and promises to kill Maranzano, as both Nucky and Luciano have grown weary of him. Luciano accepts his terms.

The following morning, Eli and two henchmen visit Maranzano at his office and stab him to death. With this, Willie is released and he shows up to work with his injuries. With Atlantic City under their control, Luciano, Lansky and Torrio decide to appoint Pinky Rabinowitz to be in charge. At Old Rumpus, Nucky talks with Joe Harper and gives him money after firing him. He then finds a letter for him. The letter was written by Gillian, who asks for his help in releasing her from the sanitarium.

== Production ==
=== Development ===
In September 2014, HBO confirmed that the seventh episode of the season would be titled "Friendless Child", and that it would be written by Riccardo DiLoreto, Christine Chambers, and executive producer Howard Korder, and directed by producer Allen Coulter. This was DiLoreto's first writing credit, Chambers' fourth writing credit, Korder's 23rd writing credit, and Coulter's eleventh directing credit.

== Reception ==
=== Viewers ===
In its original American broadcast, "Friendless Child" was seen by an estimated 1.95 million household viewers with a 0.8 in the 18–49 demographics. This means that 0.8 percent of all households with televisions watched the episode. This was a 25% increase in viewership from the previous episode, which was watched by 1.55 million household viewers with a 0.7 in the 18-49 demographics.

=== Critical reviews ===
"Friendless Child" received critical acclaim. The review aggregator website Rotten Tomatoes reported an 82% approval rating for the episode, based on 11 reviews. The site's consensus states: "It still leaves a lot of loose ends to tie up, but 'Friendless Child' offers plenty of surprises as it sets the stage for Boardwalk Empire's conclusion."

Matt Fowler of IGN gave the episode an "amazing" 9.2 out of 10 and wrote in his verdict, "'Friendless Child' finally reached, flashback-wise, the critical moment we've been waiting for. Sheriff Lindsay crumbled under the weight of his own conscience and passed the torch to Nucky, right as Gillian entered Nucky's life. In 1931, series intensity was at an all-time high as, at almost every moment, I didn't know what to expect. Nucky gambled big and lost it all. Despite knowing which side would ultimately win, there were still enough variables to keep it all suspenseful and shocking."

Alan Sepinwall of HitFix wrote, "'Friendless Child' arguably had too much plot to deal with and as a result wasn't as satisfying as last week's farewell to Van Alden and Chalky. Then again, 'Devil You Know' had the benefit of bringing two characters' stories to a definitive end, where 'Friendless Child' eliminates some side characters but leaves the real closure for next week's finale." Genevieve Valentine of The A.V. Club gave the episode a "B+" grade and wrote, "Boardwalk Empire is no stranger to a slow start followed by a sudden burst of plot at the end of the season. Stakes are even higher now, when every hour that passes brings us closer to the end of the entire series. It's no surprise, then, that the modern scenes in 'Friendless Child' are frenetically paced, racing us toward the finish line with an even higher quota of bloodshed than normal. And despite providing something of a through-line for doomed-to-be-miserable Nucky, the rush of the immediate only highlights the dreamlike tableaux of the flashbacks, leading to an episode that feels both overfull and fitful. But when Boardwalk works, it really works, and 'Friendless Child' reminds us that after a season of loss, Nucky still had farther to fall."

Sarene Leeds of Entertainment Weekly wrote, "The decision to bump off two major characters in last week's episode of Boardwalk Empire made for an excellent hour of television, but the unfortunate trade-off is that the show’s penultimate episode, 'Friendless Child,' is almost painfully anticlimactic." Craig D. Lindsey of Vulture gave the episode a 3 star rating out of 5 and wrote, "The story of Nucky Thompson and all the gangsters he came in contact with is nearly coming to a close. And even though we have one more episode left to go, the penultimate episode, 'Friendless Child,' makes sure our central character's reign as the boss of Atlantic City reaches its finite end."

Rodrigo Perez of IndieWire wrote, "'Friendless Child,' the series' penultimate episode, is pretty good when it's sticking to what Boardwalk does best. But this episode is marred by its bookends — overly stylized, contrived sequences that are completely out of character, as if they were made from an entirely different show. It's jarring and strange, especially for a show so committed to its own vision to suddenly tag on these uncharacteristic sequences." Chris O'Hara of TV Fanatic gave the episode a 4.5 star rating out of 5 and wrote, "If Nucky comes to her rescue, I wonder if she might play a part in taking down Luciano. Given their history, would he be impetuous enough to allow her to get close to him again? Boardwalk mirrors the history books in many ways, but it is not a given the way the finale will play out can be found there." Tony Sokol of Den of Geek gave the episode a perfect 5 star rating out of 5 and wrote, "'Friendless Child' is a perfectly paced, expertly filmed and acted episode, just a pubic hair off par from the second to the last episode of The Sopranos. My only criticism is that they should have introduced the earlier plotline sooner in the series itself, though I understand that the arc is going to coalesce with the fall and rise of Gillian and Nucky together."
