= Devil You Know (Boardwalk Empire) =

- Boardwalk Empire episode
- Episode no.: Season 5 Episode 6
- Directed by: Jeremy Podeswa
- Written by: Howard Korder
- Cinematography by: Bill Coleman
- Editing by: Tim Streeto
- Original air date: October 12, 2014
- Running time: 57 minutes

Guest appearances
- Domenick Lombardozzi as Ralph Capone; Marc Pickering as Young Nucky Thompson; Margot Bingham as Daughter Maitland; John Ellison Conlee as Commodore Louis Kaestner; Travis Tope as Joe Harper; Paul Calderón as Arquimedes; Louis Cancelmi as Mike D'Angelo; Dagmara Domińczyk as Dinah Linehan; Maya Kazan as Young Mabel Jeffries

Episode chronology
← Previous "King of Norway"	Next → "Friendless Child"
- Boardwalk Empire (season 5)

"Devil You Know" is the sixth episode of the fifth season of the American period crime drama television series Boardwalk Empire. It is the 54th overall episode of the series and was written by executive producer Howard Korder, and directed by Jeremy Podeswa. It was released on HBO on October 12, 2014.

The series is set in Atlantic City, New Jersey, during the Prohibition era of the 1920s. The series follows Enoch "Nucky" Thompson, a political figure who rises to prominence and interacts with mobsters, politicians, government agents, and the common folk who look up to him. In the episode, Chalky takes an important decision to save Daughter, while Van Alden and Eli are confronted over a failed robbery.

According to Nielsen Media Research, the episode was seen by an estimated 1.55 million household viewers and gained a 0.7 ratings share among adults aged 18–49, making it the least watched episode of the series. The episode received critical acclaim, with critics praising the performances, writing, emotional tone and closure to Van Alden and Chalky.

== Plot ==
=== 1897 ===
Nucky is now married to Mabel and they are expecting their first child. During his shift as Deputy, Nucky is asked by a shopkeeper to catch a boy who has been stealing from him on the boardwalk. Nucky and a young Eli eventually catch the boy under the pier, revealed to actually be a girl named Gillian.

=== 1931 ===
Having discovered Daughter in Narcisse's brothel, Chalky is told to leave, with Daughter refusing to name the father of her daughter Althea. He refuses to leave her and awaits for Narcisse, who willingly meets with him. Narcisse explains that he has prevented Daughter from resuming her music career, but Luciano's threat makes him reconsider things. He offers Chalky to work for him in the war against Luciano. Chalky accepts as long as Narcisse releases Daughter and Althea from the brothel, which he accepts.

In Atlantic City, a grieving Nucky has resorted to alcoholism after learning of Sally's death. He starts talking with two girls, Dinah and Irene, although their conversation annoys a regular patron in the bar. Nucky fights with the man, eventually knocking him unconscious. Later, in an alley, Nucky meets with the girls, who knock him unconscious and rob him. He is found by his henchman, Joe Harper, who helps him. Nucky is taken by Joe to the Old Rumpus, discovering that Mickey has assembled an army in their fight against Luciano.

In Chicago, Van Alden and Eli sneak into Capone's office to find the ledgers. However, they are caught by Ralph. Panicking, they give the excuse they were trying to rob the safe. Ralph orders D'Angelo to deal with them. However, Capone shows up after partying with George Raft and Paul Muni - actors who are in the upcoming Scarface movie, based on Capone’s life - and believes that Van Alden and Eli were plotting something more sinister than robbery. Now believing that Luciano was right about Van Alden being an undercover agent, Capone threatens to kill him. Van Alden snaps, attempts to strangles Capone, and finally confesses his real name and past in a crazed rage. However, he is killed by D'Angelo before he can kill Capone. Shaken, Eli confesses that they were forced to retrieve the ledger because a Federal agent forced them, but he misidentifies the agent as Eliot Ness. Capone orders D'Angelo to kill Eli, also giving D'Angelo his ledgers for safekeeping. Finally obtaining enough evidence, D'Angelo secretly releases Eli, allowing him to escape back to Atlantic City.

Back in New York, Daughter warns Chalky that Narcisse will betray him. Chalky states that he is aware and is willing to take the deal, knowing Daughter and Althea will live and enjoy a successful career, explaining that he knows Althea is his daughter. He says goodbye and then leaves through the back door, encountering Narcisse's men. Accepting his fate, he closes his eyes and remembers Daughter singing just as he is gunned down.

== Production ==
=== Development ===
In September 2014, HBO confirmed that the sixth episode of the season would be titled "Devil You Know", and that it would be written by executive producer Howard Korder, and directed by Jeremy Podeswa. This was Korder's 22nd writing credit, and Podeswa's seventh directing credit.

== Reception ==
=== Viewers ===
In its original American broadcast, "Devil You Know" was seen by an estimated 1.55 million household viewers with a 0.7 in the 18–49 demographics. This means that 0.7 percent of all households with televisions watched the episode. This was a 21% decrease in viewership from the previous episode, which was watched by 1.94 million household viewers with a 0.8 in the 18–49 demographics.

=== Critical reviews ===
"Devil You Know" received critical acclaim. The review aggregator website Rotten Tomatoes reported an 100% approval rating for the episode, based on 10 reviews. The site's consensus states: "Despite a shortened season, Boardwalk Empire successfully builds enough back-story and tension to gut the audience with a surprising turn of events."

Matt Fowler of IGN gave the episode an "amazing" 9 out of 10 and wrote in his verdict, "A few episodes away from the end, Boardwalk thinned the herd this week, leaving Van Alden and Chalky behind. Resembling Harrow's final sputter out, Chalky's exit was somber and sad. Totally fitting this show's treatment of its "former giants." It was supposed to hurt and it did. "Good Pain" TV at its best. Van Alden's death was a bit more jolting and comedic, but it still fit with his chaotic, mishap-filled life in Chicago. Which often felt like a different show sometimes."

Alan Sepinwall of HitFix wrote, "If 'Devil You Know' – instantly one of a handful of the very best episodes this show has ever made – is any indication, the conclusion to this season, and series, will be even more powerful than what's come before." Genevieve Valentine of The A.V. Club gave the episode an "A" grade and wrote, "we’re only now beginning to see Boardwalk Empire's willingness to burn itself to the ground. 'Devil You Know' was an episode all about being thwarted, with varying degrees of gallows humor."

Sarene Leeds of Entertainment Weekly wrote, "Last week's episode, 'King of Norway,' may have been the best of the season, but tonight's 'Devil You Know' was the most pivotal. At the expense of two of Boardwalk Empire's most complex characters (and talented actors), the show now heads into its final two episodes with Nucky Thompson front and center." Craig D. Lindsey of Vulture gave the episode a 4 star rating out of 5 and wrote, "Thanks to writer Howard Korder and director Jeremy Podeswa, both story lines were laid out as tightly coiled sequences of hermetically sealed, claustrophobic tension."

Rodrigo Perez of IndieWire wrote, "Boardwalk Empire is coming to an end, but a quickening momentum is just not something the show has on its mind currently. That said, an incredible slow tension throbs throughout the entire episode, but it's an unfortunately uneven one nonetheless." Chris O'Hara of TV Fanatic gave the episode a 4 star rating out of 5 and wrote, "With just two episodes left, it won't be long before we see the moment Nucky offered up young Gillian to secure his place in life. A move he seems destined to answer for by the end of the season."

Tony Sokol of Den of Geek gave the episode a perfect 5 star rating out of 5 and wrote, "For instance, we will never see Daughter Maitland through Chalky's eyes anymore. Was she really that attractive? Was her voice as good as it sounded to my ears? Or was it just that Chalky emanated that? I mean, it doesn't really matter. I'd buy a Sister Maitland album. Singing the songs she made famous on Boardwalk Empire. It was effective either way." Paste gave the episode a 7.6 out of 10 rating and wrote, "'The Devil You Know' completes the stories for two of Boardwalk Empire's leading men, and, as such, it's impossible to watch without wondering about the entirety of their arcs. Did they make sense? Did they add something to the show, or were they somewhat incoherent? It's an uncomfortable question for Boardwalk Empire because the answers aren't really as positive as they should be, particularly in the case of Michael Shannon's Nelson Van Alden."
