= Boardwalk Empire season 5 =

Boardwalk Empire
- Season 5
- DVD cover
- No. of episodes: 8

Release
- Original network: HBO
- Original release: September 7 – October 26, 2014

Season chronology
- ← Previous; Season 4

The fifth and final season of the HBO television series Boardwalk Empire premiered on September 7, 2014, and concluded on October 26, 2014, consisting of 8 episodes. The series was created by Terence Winter and based on the book Boardwalk Empire: The Birth, High Times and Corruption of Atlantic City by Nelson Johnson. Set in Atlantic City, New Jersey, during the Prohibition era, the series stars Steve Buscemi as Enoch "Nucky" Thompson (based loosely on the historical Enoch "Nucky" Johnson), a political figure who rose to prominence and controlled Atlantic City, New Jersey, during the Prohibition period of the 1920s and early 1930s. The fifth season takes place between April and October 1931, seven years after the previous season, during the Great Depression, with flashbacks to 1884 and 1897 detailing Nucky's childhood and young adulthood. On January 13, 2015, the fifth season was made available on DVD and Blu-ray in region 1.

== Production ==
HBO renewed Boardwalk Empire for a fifth season on September 26, 2013, and announced on January 9, 2014, that it would be the final season. The New York budget for the show's final season was $87.2 million.

== Cast and characters ==
=== Main cast ===
Departing the main cast from the previous season are Anthony Laciura, Jack Huston, Ron Livingston and Michael Stuhlbarg. Ben Rosenfield was promoted to main cast after recurring in the previous season.

- Steve Buscemi as Enoch "Nucky" Thompson
- Kelly Macdonald as Margaret Thompson
- Michael Shannon as Nelson Van Alden/George Mueller
- Shea Whigham as Elias "Eli" Thompson
- Stephen Graham as Al Capone
- Vincent Piazza as Charlie Luciano
- Michael Kenneth Williams as Albert "Chalky" White
- Paul Sparks as Mickey Doyle
- Jeffrey Wright as Dr. Valentin Narcisse
- Ben Rosenfield as Willie Thompson
- Gretchen Mol as Gillian Darmody

=== Recurring cast ===
- John Ellison Conlee as young Commodore Louis Kaestner
- Paul Calderón as Arquimedes
- Louis Cancelmi as Mike D'Angelo
- Boris McGiver as Sheriff Jacob Lindsay
- Travis Tope as Joe Harper / Tommy Darmody
- Domenick Lombardozzi as Ralph Capone
- Nolan Lyons as young Enoch Thompson, 1884
- Oakes Fegley as Elias "Eli" Thompson, 1884
- Marc Pickering as Enoch Thompson, 1897
- Anatol Yusef as Meyer Lansky
- Michael Zegen as Bugsy Siegel
- Ian Hart as young Ethan Thompson
- Giampiero Judica as Salvatore Maranzano
- Maya Kazan as Mabel Jeffries
- Matt Letscher as Joe Kennedy
- Greg Antonacci as Johnny Torrio
- Patricia Arquette as Sally Wheet
- Joe Caniano as Jake Guzik
- Madeleine Rose Yen as young Gillian Darmody
- Margot Bingham as Daughter Maitland
- Chris Caldovino as Tonino Sandrelli
- Ethan Herschenfeld as Pinky Rabinowitz
- Ryan Johnson as Althea
- Christiane Seidel as Sigrid Mueller
- Ivo Nandi as Joe Masseria
- Jim True-Frost as Eliot Ness

== Episodes ==
No. overall	No. in season	Title	Directed by	Written by	Original release date	US viewers (millions)
49	1	"Golden Days for Boys and Girls"	Tim Van Patten	Howard Korder	September 7, 2014	2.37
Awash in memories from his pier-boy days growing up in 1884 Atlantic City, Nucky remembers first catching the eye of the Commodore. In 1931, Nucky joins Sally Wheet in Cuba, and with a U.S Senator in tow, forges ties with Bacardi Rum with the hope of Prohibition's repeal in the U.S. The trip takes a strange turn as Nucky coincidentally bumps into Meyer Lansky while dining, who states he's just on vacation with his wife. Nucky questions Lansky's presence after a failed assassination attempt later that evening, thwarted by new bodyguard Arquimedes. Back in New York, an older Luciano sets up a meeting with Joe Masseria to discuss rival gangster Salvatore Maranzano and to put the Castellammarese War to an end. As their discussion concludes, Luciano excuses himself to the washroom, leaving Masseria to be gunned down at the table by Bugsy Siegel and Tonino Sandrelli. Albert White is now part of a chain gang and working prison detail in the woods when a riot breaks out; amidst the chaos, Chalky is able to snag the keys from a dead guard and escapes—though temporarily confronted by the gun-toting, somewhat mentally unstable Milton. Margaret is moving up the ranks at her job in New York but her life of independence and stability is thrown into danger after her boss commits suicide. Luciano appears before the Maranzano family and pledges loyalty to Maranzano. Through flashbacks, the early life of a young Enoch and Eli Thompson is depicted, showing their volatile upbringing and the relationship between Enoch and a young Commodore.
50	2	"The Good Listener"	Allen Coulter	Terence Winter	September 14, 2014	1.81
Seven-year exile Eli Thompson has hit rock bottom, now a perpetual drunk and working as a debt collector for the Chicago Outfit with George Mueller, who is now one of Capone's veteran members. Mueller's life is starting to unravel as well, as the tension at home becomes evident through the strained exchanges with his wife and children. Gillian Darmody has gone completely clean during her court-mandated confinement in a women's sanitarium and begins planning how to get out. Eli's son Willie Thompson is now pursuing a career as a prosecutor but with a possible ulterior motive. Nucky sits down with retired Chicago boss Johnny Torrio to discuss recent events and Torrio arranges a meeting between Nucky and Maranzano. Luciano, Lansky, Siegel and Tonino meet to discuss their next move, with the former uneasy about Tonino based on his treacherous past. Nucky later sits down with Maranzano and Luciano, but in doing so recalls Tonino's culpability after seeing a boardwalk caricature in memory of old flame Billie Kent. After the Maranzano meeting, Nucky arranges a private meeting with Tonino, who warns him that Luciano is plotting against him. When pressed by Nucky, Tonino offers his loyalty whenever Nucky should ask. Later that evening, Lansky is rushed outside to find a dead Tonino thrown on his steps—murdered in open acknowledgement of Lansky and Luciano's murder attempt on Nucky in Havana, as well as vengeance for Tonino's part in Billie's death.
51	3	"What Jesus Said"	Ed Bianchi	Cristine Chambers & Howard Korder	September 21, 2014	2.11
Runaway convicts Chalky and Milton seek refuge in a house but stumble across a mother and daughter living there. Milton insists they take them hostage and accuses the mother of past wrongs and a hidden safe despite her insistence of neither of these things. In the past, Nucky as a child begins to learn how to work hard through his employment under the Commodore; while working there, he chances to meet a young Mabel, his future first wife. Margaret is brought in for questioning about her boss's suicide and Arnold Rothstein's name surfaces, in conjunction with questionable stock trading practices. Nucky goes forward with his rum dealing and attempts to persuade Boston powerhouse Joseph Kennedy of the merits of a working partnership. Luciano and Benny Siegel sit down with Chalky White's old rival, Dr. Valentin Narcisse, to coerce him into entering a protection deal. Narcisse rejects the offer, so Luciano has Siegel and another mobster kill some of Narcisse's men and prostitutes at his brothel. Following hours of tense confrontation and questioning of their hostages, Chalky kills Milton with a hammer to the head after Milton puts a cocked revolver to the daughter's head. While this occurs, the mother and daughter retrieve the dropped gun but do not shoot Chalky and instead order him to take the nine dollars they have and get out. After a heated discussion with Rothstein's widow, who threatens to sue Margaret for the money she knows Rothstein gave her in exchange for inside stock information, Margaret goes to see Nucky.
52	4	"Cuanto"	Jake Paltrow	Howard Korder & Cristine Chambers & Terence Winter	September 28, 2014	2.05
Nucky and Margaret tentatively reconcile to deal with Mrs. Rothstein's threats. Luciano visits Chicago and tries to bring Al Capone into the Italian-only business plan and fails but while there recognizes Van Alden as the prohibition agent from 10 years ago in New Jersey. Van Alden pleads for his life after Capone sticks a gun in his mouth. Capone spares him after Van Alden makes a compelling speech, which shrewdly appeals to his ego while making insinuations about Luciano's lack of respect. Joseph Kennedy backs out of the potential rum deal with Nucky, citing "scotch and rum don't really mix". Sally is stopped by a Cuban federal patrol and tries to get out of the trouble she senses by flirting, dropping important names and bribery but these tactics only serve to aggravate the situation. After a brief struggle, Sally manages to grab a soldier's gun and starts to back away into the darkness slowly but is accidentally shot and killed by one of the soldiers in mid-sentence.
53	5	"King of Norway"	Ed Bianchi	Steve Kornacki	October 5, 2014	1.94
In 1897, Nucky as a young adult is a deputy sheriff for Atlantic City, pursuing marriage to Mabel while struggling against the disapproval and condescension of her father. In the present 1931, Chalky discreetly seeks out Nucky to learn the location of Valentin Narcisse. Although Nucky doesn't know, he gives him a safe place to stay, knowing the law is after him. Tensions hit their peak at the Mueller household as a family dinner with Eli Thompson and June reveals that the bitter Sigrid has been having an affair with Eli, which he—being constantly drunk and prone to blackouts—can't fully remember. Feds (including Mike D'Angelo) then show up at the Mueller house and arrest Eli and Nelson. Nucky sits down with Torrio to discuss a new meeting with Maranzano, which Torrio sets up and plans to attend. Nucky meets Maranzano to discuss Luciano but notes that Torrio has not shown, when men pull up and machine-gun the restaurant storefront. Eli and Nelson are blackmailed by the feds to work with them against Al Capone by stealing his financial ledgers or face prison and the death penalty. Having survived the murder attempt, Nucky calls Torrio, now knowing that he has been in league with Luciano and Lansky and warns Torrio that he is coming for all of them. Chalky locates Narcisse's brothel to kill him but instead finds a small girl sleeping on the couch and his old mistress, Daughter Maitland, in his room.
54	6	"Devil You Know"	Jeremy Podeswa	Howard Korder	October 12, 2014	1.55
In 1897, Deputy Nucky is married to Mabel and expecting their first child, while trying to capture a young boy who has been thieving and peddling on the boardwalk—later revealed to be a young girl named Gillian. In 1931, Nucky drowns his grief over Sally's death at a sleazy dive, where he ends up in a drunken fight and is robbed by two women who leave him knocked out in the alley. Eli and Van Alden are held by Ralph Capone after their plan to steal the ledgers from Capone's office fails. Mike D'Angelo attempts to get the two out under cover of disposing them quickly and quietly with his own men, which Ralph agrees to avoid upsetting Al. Al returns with the movie stars George Raft and Paul Muni before they can leave and finds out about the failed theft. Chalky and Narcisse meet again, with Narcisse willingly entering the room unarmed and alone to talk to Chalky. In return for his loyalty, Narcisse will release Daughter Maitland and her child and remove the blockade he's placed to prevent anyone from playing Daughter's new record. Capone threatens Nelson, who admits to his past as a Prohi, but is shot in the head by Mike D'Angelo before he can reveal that the feds are investigating Capone. Mickey raises an army as Nucky prepares to move against Luciano, Lansky and Torrio. Daughter, afraid for Chalky's life, warns him of Narcisse's treachery when Chalky agrees to work for him but Chalky knows that he will be betrayed. He takes the deal to help Daughter pursue the success and life he believes she should have and tenderly says goodbye to her before being executed.
55	7	"Friendless Child"	Allen Coulter	Riccardo DiLoreto & Cristine Chambers and Howard Korder	October 19, 2014	1.95
Back in the past, Deputy Nucky has now moved young Gillian into his home, where she is groomed and cared for by Mabel. Sheriff Lindsay resigns and hands his sheriff's badge to Nucky, having finally reached the limits of his conscience. Nucky learns the ugly reality of what it means to work for the Commodore. Seeing a young girl shivering and clutching her clothes to herself within and the partially clothed Commodore hurriedly leaving, Deputy Nucky is left with the clear knowledge that the Commodore is a child molester. At war with Luciano, Nucky looks to hold onto his assets in Atlantic City. Nucky has Bugsy Siegel kidnapped after a gun battle that leaves Siegel with a bullet in the leg, though Luciano initially appears unmoved by his friend's plight. Released by Mike D'Angelo and assumed dead by Al Capone, Eli tries to reconcile with his son Will in a painful meeting outside his workplace. Eli walks away from the meeting, leaving an emotionally conflicted Will, but does not get far before witnessing Pinky Rabinowitz kidnap Will. Nucky, Luciano and Lansky later meet to make an exchange of hostages. Desperate to save Will, Nucky offers everything he has and offers to take care of Maranzano within the next twenty-four hours. Knowing that ownership of the club will now go to Luciano and Lansky, Mickey Doyle tries to approach them and wheedle to retain management but is shot in the throat by an unimpressed Luciano. Maranzano and his men are murdered at his office by Nucky’s men posing as federal agents. Lansky and Luciano chat with Torrio and agree that Atlantic City will go to Pinky. Sitting alone, Nucky contemplates everything that has happened and finally opens and reads the letter sent to him from Gillian Darmody, who pleads for him to show the same compassion and help he offered her as a young child.
56	8	"Eldorado"	Tim Van Patten	Howard Korder & Terence Winter	October 26, 2014	2.33
In the past, Deputy Nucky finds out Mabel has miscarried, much to his shock. He is then summoned to his family home, where he physically beats his father for hitting his mother again and warns there will be consequences if harm ever comes to his mother. After returning to Atlantic City, Nucky comes across Gillian, who is participating in a parade. The Commodore promotes Nucky to Sheriff and his first task is to deliver Gillian to him. Nucky reluctantly approaches Gillian, telling her that the Commodore is willing to take her in, promising that he will look out for her. With his holdings in Atlantic City lost, Nucky decides to go for a swim in the ocean. In New York, due to Nucky's manipulation of Mayflower stock, Kennedy's business associates are nervous that repeal will not happen and begin unloading their shares. Kennedy suspects Nucky's involvement, but Margaret convinces him to short sell his shares. Margaret meets Nucky to inform him of her success and it appears that they will rekindle their relationship but are interrupted. Nucky later returns to Atlantic City, intending to leave it forever. He meets Eli, gives him some money and encourages him to return to his family. He meets Gillian in the mental hospital, telling her the most he can do is set up a trust fund for her when she is released. It's revealed that Gillian has undergone surgery for her feigned insanity by psychiatrist, Dr Henry Cotton, while in the hospital. Back in New York, Luciano and Lansky gather crime bosses from around the country and form the Commission, a singular body to mediate relations between crime organizations. Luciano tells Bugsy to kill Narcisse who is assassinated in front of his church. In Chicago, Capone is served a court summons after the authorities get his ledgers. While he publicly boasts that the charges of tax evasion won't stick, Capone says goodbye to his son before heading to court, where D'Angelo is waiting for him. Nucky comes across Joe Harper who reveals himself as Tommy Darmody, Jimmy's son and Gillian's grandson and shoots Nucky three times before being restrained by revenue agents. As Nucky dies, he sees a younger version of himself swimming in the ocean and catching a coin.

== Reception ==
The fifth season of Boardwalk Empire received positive reviews from critics. On the review aggregator website Metacritic, the fifth season scored 83 out of 100 based on 12 reviews. Another aggregator website, Rotten Tomatoes, gave the fifth season an 88% rating, based on 132 reviews with an average score of 8.05/10, with the site consensus stating "The final season of Boardwalk Empire is as visually dazzling and well-acted as ever, but it's the emphasis on Nucky Thompson's history that's particularly rewarding this time out."

For the 67th Writers Guild of America Awards, the series received two nominations for Best Episodic Drama—Howard Korder for "Devil You Know", and Riccardo DiLoreto, Cristine Chambers and Howard Korder for "Friendless Child". For the 21st Screen Actors Guild Awards, the cast was nominated for Best Drama Ensemble, Steve Buscemi was nominated for Best Drama Actor, and the series was nominated for Best Stunt Team.

For the 67th Primetime Emmy Awards, Tim Van Patten was nominated for Outstanding Directing for a Drama Series for "Eldorado". For the 67th Primetime Creative Arts Emmy Awards, the series received nine nominations, and won for Outstanding Cinematography for a Single-Camera Series and Outstanding Production Design for a Narrative Period Program (One Hour or More).
