= King of Norway (Boardwalk Empire) =

- Boardwalk Empire episode
- Episode no.: Season 5 Episode 5
- Directed by: Ed Bianchi
- Written by: Steve Kornacki
- Cinematography by: Jonathan Freeman
- Editing by: Kate Sanford
- Original air date: October 5, 2014
- Running time: 54 minutes

Guest appearances
- Anatol Yusef as Meyer Lansky; Domenick Lombardozzi as Ralph Capone; Boris McGiver as Sheriff Jacob Lindsay; Joyce Van Patten as Mae Zeller; Greg Antonacci as Johnny Torrio; John Ellison Conlee as Commodore Louis Kaestner; Byron Jennings as Dr. Henry Cotton; Margot Bingham as Daughter Maitland; Marc Pickering as Young Nucky Thompson; Travis Tope as Joe Harper; Giampiero Judica as Salvatore Maranzano; Louis Cancelmi as Mike D'Angelo; Christiane Seidel as Sigrid Mueller; Michael Countryman as Frank Wilson; Paul Calderón as Arquimedes; Maya Kazan as Young Mabel Jeffries; John C. Vennema as Lawrence Conors; Danny McCarthy as Pat Halligan; Shae D'lyn as Carolyn Rothstein

Episode chronology
← Previous "Cuanto"	Next → "Devil You Know"
- Boardwalk Empire (season 5)

"King of Norway" is the fifth episode of the fifth season of the American period crime drama television series Boardwalk Empire. It is the 53rd overall episode of the series and was written by Steve Kornacki, and directed by Ed Bianchi. It was released on HBO on October 5, 2014.

The series is set in Atlantic City, New Jersey, during the Prohibition era of the 1920s. The series follows Enoch "Nucky" Thompson, a political figure who rises to prominence and interacts with mobsters, politicians, government agents, and the common folk who look up to him. In the episode, Nucky meets with Salvatore Maranzano in New York City, while Van Alden and Eli are targeted by Federal agents.

According to Nielsen Media Research, the episode was seen by an estimated 1.94 million household viewers and gained a 0.8 ratings share among adults aged 18–49. The episode received mostly positive reviews from critics, who praised the performances and directing, although some felt that the pacing didn't help in advancing the storylines.

== Plot ==
=== 1897 ===
A young adult Nucky now works as a Deputy Sheriff in Atlantic City, responding to both Lindsay and the Commodore. He later dines with Mabel and her father, with the father privately telling him he does not like him at all. A few days later, Nucky is called to the pier for a body, a person who was making problems for the Commodore.

=== 1931 ===
At the women's sanitarium, Gillian is horrified to find that a friend of hers ended up in a catatonic state following a procedure. Gillian wants to get out by claiming sanity, but the doctor, Henry Cotton, is convinced that he must perform a surgery to cure her.

In Chicago, Capone decides to move their base of operations to Cicero. Eli is visited by his wife, June, who is pregnant. They then have dinner with Van Alden and Sigrid at their house, where Sigrid finally reveals that she and Eli had an affair, something that Eli cannot remember due to his alcoholism. Just then, Mike D'Angelo arrives with another agent and arrests Eli and Van Alden. D'Angelo wants evidence to charge Capone for tax evasion and blackmails Van Alden and Eli into cooperating with him. He demands that they retrieve Capone's financial ledgers, or face charges for their multiple crimes.

In Atlantic City, Nucky meets with Chalky at the Old Rumpus. Chalky wants to kill Narcisse but Nucky convinces him to stay hidden for the time being with his help. Later, in Harlem, Chalky arrives at one of Narcisse's brothels to kill him. However, he discovers Daughter with a small girl, her daughter.

Nucky then travels to New York City to meet with Torrio and schedules another meeting with Salvatore Maranzano. However, their meeting turns out to be a drive-by shooting, although both Nucky and Maranzano survive, noting that Torrio failed to show up. Nucky calls Torrio, realizing that he was conspiring with Luciano and Lansky in killing him, and promises to kill all three of them. He also calls his associate in Cuba, who informs him of Sally's death. Nucky is angered that he cannot seek revenge, as the soldiers responsible were never identified.

Margaret pays Carolyn Rothstein, and decides to open a bank account for Nucky under an alias.

== Production ==
=== Development ===
In September 2014, HBO confirmed that the fifth episode of the season would be titled "King of Norway", and that it would be written by Steve Kornacki, and directed by Ed Bianchi. This was Kornacki's sixth writing credit, and Bianchi's seventh directing credit.

== Reception ==
=== Viewers ===
In its original American broadcast, "King of Norway" was seen by an estimated 1.94 million household viewers with a 0.8 in the 18-49 demographics. This means that 0.8 percent of all households with televisions watched the episode. This was a 6% decrease in viewership from the previous episode, which was watched by 2.05 million household viewers with a 0.8 in the 18-49 demographics.

=== Critical reviews ===
"King of Norway" received mostly positive reviews from critics. The review aggregator website Rotten Tomatoes reported an 100% approval rating for the episode, based on 11 reviews. The site's consensus states: "With the end of Boardwalk Empire in sight, 'King of Norway' takes great strides in setting up crucial confrontations for its key players with propulsive storytelling and some calculated character beats."

Matt Fowler of IGN gave the episode a "great" 8.3 out of 10 and wrote in his verdict, "Each week here I get the feeling that this season is waiting until the end (perhaps even the very end) to play its hand. We've essentially gotten five episodes of build so far, though Chalky finding Daughter right there at the end felt like one of the first signs of true story-shock. Even more so than Sally's death, which even Nucky was told over the phone was arbitrary and untouchable. It's a good build, but the enjoyment of "setting the table" can wear thin."

Alan Sepinwall of HitFix wrote, "As we move into this final season's second half, things are starting to move quickly – these last few episodes have all taken place within a few days of each other – but maybe a little too quickly at times." Genevieve Valentine of The A.V. Club gave the episode an "A–" grade and wrote, "Though this show enjoys its careful balance of meditations on a theme, pitch-black comedy, and gleeful bloodbaths, sometimes it's best when Boardwalk Empire cuts to the bone: This is a show about family, and that can be as poisonous as it gets. Families of all kinds were on display in 'King of Norway,' one of those stellar episodes in which the half-season of setup begins to unfurl, balancing plotlines along a single cunning edge, resurrecting old ghosts, allowing character beats to overlap in ways that mean little to them and everything to us, and building a beautiful dread as it goes."

Sarene Leeds of Entertainment Weekly wrote, "If there is one positive to the abbreviated eight-episode final season of Boardwalk Empire, it's that we only had to slog through four lukewarm episodes in order to get from last year's fiery finale 'Farewell Daddy Blues' to the next (and, possibly, last) truly stellar hour of the series. Although, with only three episodes left, 'King of Norway' will, at the very least, end up the fourth-best episode of the season, which ain't too shabby." Craig D. Lindsey of Vulture gave the episode a 3 star rating out of 5 and wrote, "Well, we have three episodes left in the Boardwalk Empire saga and, as 'King of Norway' shows, things are beginning to unravel at a breakneck pace. This episode alone had many of the characters getting immersed in, if not pandemonium (as Van Alden noted a few episodes back), then full-on, life-shattering hysteria."

Rodrigo Perez of IndieWire wrote, "Accept it: Boardwalk Empire will be slow and graceful to the end, With only three episodes left, the show feels as if long candle-wicks lit long ago are now traveling down to what likely will be an explosive conclusion. Or at least that's the paradigm of Terence Winter's show thus far. I'm not sure now is the time to surprise us, but Boardwalk hasn't really deigned to speed up its pace in its final, shortened season." Chris O'Hara of TV Fanatic gave the episode a 4.5 star rating out of 5 and wrote, "With friends like that, who needs enemies? Nucky was reunited with his old friend Chalky this week on 'King of Norway', but was betrayed by another when he traveled to New York."

Tony Sokol of Den of Geek gave the episode a 4.5 star rating out of 5 and wrote, "In Boardwalk Empire's 'King of Norway,' Nucky knows where he's going because he knows where the bodies are buried. He may not have been born to mob rule, but he acclimates." Paste gave the episode a 7.1 out of 10 rating and wrote, "while I had a lot of quibbles with 'King of Norway,' it was still a good, fun episode that began connecting for the show's finale, which is just a few weeks away."
