= Golden Days for Boys and Girls (Boardwalk Empire) =

- Boardwalk Empire episode
- Episode no.: Season 5 Episode 1
- Directed by: Tim Van Patten
- Written by: Howard Korder
- Cinematography by: Jonathan Freeman
- Editing by: Kate Sanford
- Original air date: September 7, 2014
- Running time: 59 minutes

Guest appearances
- Patricia Arquette as Sally Wheet; Anatol Yusef as Meyer Lansky; Ian Hart as Ethan Thompson; Chris Caldovino as Tonino Sandrelli; Ivo Nandi as Joe Masseria; Boris McGiver as Sheriff Jacob Lindsay; Michael Zegen as Bugsy Siegel; John Ellison Conlee as Commodore Louis Kaestner; Erin Dilly as Elenore Thompson; Giampiero Judica as Salvatore Maranzano; Patch Darragh as Robert Bennett III; Paul Calderón as Arquimedes; John C. Vennema as Lawrence Conors; Danny McCarthy as Pat Halligan; Nolan Lyons as Young Nucky Thompson; Oakes Fegley as Young Eli Thompson

Episode chronology
| ← Previous "Farewell Daddy Blues" | Next → "The Good Listener" |
- Boardwalk Empire (season 5)

"Golden Days for Boys and Girls" is the first episode of the fifth season of the American period crime drama television series Boardwalk Empire. It is the 49th overall episode of the series and was written by executive producer Howard Korder, and directed by executive producer Tim Van Patten. It was released on HBO on September 7, 2014.

The series is set in Atlantic City, New Jersey, during the Prohibition era of the 1920s. The series follows Enoch "Nucky" Thompson, a political figure who rises to prominence and interacts with mobsters, politicians, government agents, and the common folk who look up to him. In the episode, Nucky starts a new strategy in 1931, while flashbacks to 1884 depict his childhood.

According to Nielsen Media Research, the episode was seen by an estimated 2.37 million household viewers and gained a 0.9 ratings share among adults aged 18–49. The episode received generally positive reviews from critics, who praised the directing and performances. The seven-year time jump, however, polarized critics; some felt it would allow more progress in the characters' arcs, while others expressed disappointment over the events skipped.

== Plot ==
=== 1884 ===
A young Nucky swims next to the pier with other boys, where the Commodore throws them gold coins to retrieve, but Nucky fails to catch any coins. His father, Ethan, is disappointed in Nucky's failure, and Nucky's mother Elenore lives scared of Ethan. Nucky meets a businessman upon losing his hat after it blew away in the wind. Nucky finds the hat which contains a $50 note, and later returns the hat and money to the businessman. This impresses the Commodore, who gives him a gold coin. Nucky gives the coin to Elenore, while Ethan tends to Nucky's ill sister, Susan.

=== 1931 ===
In Havana, Nucky stays with Sally Wheet. He meets with Senator Wendell Lloyd to get him involved in his business, convincing him in accepting a partnership with Bacardi Rum. He also runs into Lansky, who is now married and is on vacation. Later, an assassin tries to kill Nucky, but is killed by his bodyguard Arquimedes. Nucky suspects Lansky was involved, after discovering that his "wife" is actually a local prostitute.

In Maryland, Chalky is now in police custody and is forced to be part of a chain gang. While doing labor in the woods, Chalky sees as one of the inmates revolts against the guards by killing one, prompting the rest of the inmates to riot. Chalky releases himself and flees, only to be held at gunpoint by Milton, another inmate. Milton claims he has money stored in a house and offers to share it with Chalky if he helps him with the use of a telephone, which Chalky accepts.

In New York City, Robert Bennett III kills himself in front of his employees, one of which is Margaret. Margaret is approached about opening Bennett's files, and lies claiming that she does not have the key. She later tries to remove the deceased Rothstein's file but is forced to give the key to Bennett's files when she is caught.

In Coney Island, Luciano meets with Masseria, discussing a potential end in their war against Salvatore Maranzano. Luciano then leaves their meeting, allowing hitmen to kill Masseria. He later attends a ceremony by the Maranzano family, where he slices his hand to show his loyalty.

== Production ==
=== Development ===
In August 2014, HBO confirmed that the first episode of the season would be titled "Golden Days for Boys and Girls", and that it would be written by executive producer Howard Korder, and directed by executive producer Tim Van Patten. This was Korder's 19th writing credit, and Van Patten's 17th directing credit.

== Reception ==
=== Viewers ===
In its original American broadcast, "Golden Days for Boys and Girls" was seen by an estimated 2.37 million household viewers with a 0.9 in the 18-49 demographics. This means that 0.9 percent of all households with televisions watched the episode. This was a 8% increase in viewership from the previous episode, which was watched by 2.18 million household viewers with a 0.7 in the 18-49 demographics.

=== Critical reviews ===
"Golden Days for Boys and Girls" received generally positive reviews from critics. The review aggregator website Rotten Tomatoes reported an 91% approval rating for the episode, based on 11 reviews. The site's consensus states: "The flashbacks in 'Golden Days for Boys and Girls' provide poignant, intriguing glimpses into Nucky Thompson's formative years."

Matt Fowler of IGN gave the episode a "great" 8.1 out of 10 and wrote in his verdict, "All in all, this was a good premiere. But I think that, after skipping over seven years, I was sort of disappointed in what I saw from our characters. There've been many times when Nucky's come off as the least interesting character on the series, and so to see that he was more or less the same guy after such a long time - no new scars, revelations, family - felt lacking. Which is probably why the moments where he reminisced back to a time when he actually endured strife and molded those experiences into a character arc was so compelling."

Alan Sepinwall of HitFix wrote, "Will the various stories introduced here pay off as well for us in the audience as Nucky's gamble did? We'll see, especially with a shorter season to play with. But after the previous four seasons all ended so well – and almost always made the slow early parts of those years feel rewarding in hindsight – I've learned not to bet against this show." Genevieve Valentine of The A.V. Club gave the episode a "B" grade and wrote, "though I look forward to the ways in which the season establishes itself in 1931, this episode doesn't get us there. Perhaps the most interesting consequence of that is how some of the threads being introduced feel both perfunctory — establishing dynamics after some long and unseen purgatory — and like the characters themselves aren't quite sure what's kept them treading water for so long."

Sarene Leeds of Entertainment Weekly wrote, "If anything, skipping over the rest of the 1920s merely proves that people don't change that much — which suggests that Nucky will never be able to really leave his criminal past behind. After all, he wasn't a stranger to illegal activities before Prohibition. The only startling example of the passage of time comes in the form of the grey stubble on Chalky White's face." Craig D. Lindsey of Vulture gave the episode a 4 star rating out of 5 and wrote, "Boardwalk Empire looks like it's going to remind us in its final eight episodes how the past always comes back around, either repeating itself, returning to haunt somebody or just ready to bite somebody in the ass. Personally, I can't think of a better way for the show to go out."

Rodrigo Perez of IndieWire wrote, "Perhaps it'll pick up, but as a first episode of the final season, anyone who's griped about the pace of the show's narrative won't find much reprieve here. On the flipside, Terence Winter and his writers are evidently sticking to their guns no matter what. Empires always fall, as will Nucky Thompson's reign, but how and when? Boardwalk Empire hasn't even introduced the central conflict that will take us there." Chris O'Hara of TV Fanatic gave the episode a perfect 5 star rating out of 5 and wrote, "It's interesting to note that Nucky's plan depends on a Democrat taking office. Where will he be without all his connections in Washington? Legit or not, his new business is being built on a foundation of crime. Nucky's sordid past came up more than once this week. I wonder if he will even last long enough to see the changes in government he needs to come about."

Tony Sokol of Den of Geek gave the episode a 4 star rating out of 5 and wrote, "Nucky's come a long way since sharing sour balls with his dying sister and sweeping up for the Commodore, who is played by a Dabney Coleman look. Sally Wheet might not see the point in looking back, but Nucky looks back at those old wounds and sees opportunities. How else could you build a Boardwalk Empire on the sand." Paste gave the episode a 6.2 out of 10 rating and wrote, "It was a disappointing start for Boardwalk Empire's final season. We had the usual plotting and killings and arty cinematography that keep the show's ratings decent, but it was all still very hollow. For its final season, the show seems to want to bring the focus back onto Nucky, but as usual there's no particularly compelling reason to care about what happens to him."
