= The Pony (Boardwalk Empire) =

- Boardwalk Empire episode
- Episode no.: Season 3 Episode 8
- Directed by: Tim Van Patten
- Written by: Terence Winter; Howard Korder
- Cinematography by: Bill Coleman
- Editing by: Tim Streeto
- Original air date: November 4, 2012
- Running time: 58 minutes

Guest appearances
- James Cromwell as Andrew Mellon; Stephen Root as Gaston Means; Dominic Chianese as Leander Whitlock; Julianne Nicholson as Esther Randolph; Greg Antonacci as Johnny Torrio; Meg Steedle as Billie Kent; Patrick Kennedy as Dr. Douglas Mason; Arron Shiver as Dean O'Banion; Kerry O'Malley as Edwina Shearer; Clarke Thorell as Clifton King

Episode chronology
| ← Previous "Sunday Best" | Next → "The Milkmaid's Lot" |
- Boardwalk Empire (season 3)

"The Pony" is the eighth episode of the third season of the American period crime drama television series Boardwalk Empire. It is the 32nd overall episode of the series and was written by series creator Terence Winter and executive producer Howard Korder, and directed by executive producer Tim Van Patten. It was released on HBO on November 4, 2012.

The series is set in Atlantic City, New Jersey, during the Prohibition era of the 1920s. The series follows Enoch "Nucky" Thompson, a political figure who rises to prominence and interacts with mobsters, politicians, government agents, and the common folk who look up to him. In the episode, Nucky meets with Mellon to conspire against Daugherty, while Gillian finally gets a loan for the Artemis Club, and Van Alden reaches his breaking point in Chicago.

According to Nielsen Media Research, the episode was seen by an estimated 2.09 million household viewers and gained a 0.7 ratings share among adults aged 18–49. The episode received extremely positive reviews from critics, who praised the performances, directing, writing and ending.

== Plot ==
Gillian, Richard and Leander Whitlock arrange for Roger's body to be identified as Jimmy's body, which makes Gillian eligible for a loan for the Artemis Club. After being informed of this, Nucky visits her to offer condolences. However, Gillian furiously throws a drink in his face and accuses him of killing Jimmy, which he denies. Later, Gillian learns from Luciano that he will meet with Nucky and Rothstein for dinner that night at Babette's, which angers her. She discloses this information to Gyp and buys Luciano out of his share of the Artemis Club, telling him to leave.

In Chicago, Van Alden is now on Dean O'Banion's payroll, providing him with liquor in exchange for disposing of Agent Coughlin's corpse. At his office, Van Alden is called upon to participate in a sales demonstration with his co-workers. He suddenly violently attacks his co-worker when he insults Sigrid, which culminates with him wreaking havoc in the office, horrifying everyone. He flees silently before anyone can call the police. He wants to move out of Chicago, but Sigrid convinces him that they can earn enough money through their partnership with O'Banion. Torrio has returned from Italy, meeting with Capone and O'Banion, with the latter angry for Capone's murder of Joe Miller. Torrio is not concerned about the matter, feeling that Capone has everything under control.

Nucky visits New York City, where Gaston Means has arranged a meeting with Secretary of the Treasury Andrew Mellon. Nucky offers to run Mellon's Old Overholt distillery in exchange for indicting George Remus, whose arrest will negatively affect Harry M. Daugherty and implicate Jess Smith. Mellon considers it before eventually accepting, asking him to start operations within one month. Nucky is also struggling in his relationship with Billie Kent, as he questions if she will really be successful on her own. Meanwhile, Margaret continues taking care of the women's clinic, while also asking for Owen's help in getting a pony for Emily's birthday.

Before meeting with Rothstein and Luciano, Nucky meets with Billie to give her an annuity, wishing her good luck on her new film career as they seemingly mutually agree to end their relationship. Billie accompanies Nucky, Rothstein and Luciano on the boardwalk on their way to dine, when they are stopped by an old friend of Nucky. Annoyed by his friend's behavior, Nucky tells Billie to go to the restaurant while they stay behind for a moment. While Nucky looks at Billie mid-conversation, the restaurant suddenly explodes. Nucky, Rothstein, and Luciano survive despite their injuries, but Billie dies in the explosion.

== Production ==
=== Development ===
The episode was written by series creator Terence Winter and executive producer Howard Korder, and directed by executive producer Tim Van Patten. This was Winter's eighth writing credit, Korder's ninth writing credit, and Van Patten's eleventh directing credit.

== Reception ==
=== Viewers ===
In its original American broadcast, "The Pony" was seen by an estimated 2.09 million household viewers with a 0.7 in the 18-49 demographics. This means that 0.7 percent of all households with televisions watched the episode. This was a slight increase in viewership from the previous episode, which was watched by 1.97 million household viewers with a 0.7 in the 18-49 demographics.

=== Critical reviews ===
"The Pony" received extremely positive reviews from critics. Matt Fowler of IGN gave the episode a "great" 8.2 out of 10 and wrote, "'The Pony,' named after both young Emily's present and Billie's middling career as an almost-star, got dragged down a bit by its Margaret/Owen scenes and Nucky's extremely stuffy dealings with James Cromwell's Andrew Mellon. Although, it does come as a bit of a relief to watch Cromwell give a fine and mannered performance after watching him play Dr. Nutcase the past few weeks over on American Horror Story. Those drawbacks aside, this episode helped launch Nucky forward into his inevitable, haunting 'I have everything, and yet nothing' loneliness."

Noel Murray of The A.V. Club gave the episode an "A–" grade and wrote, "'The Pony' is a step down from last week's excellent Boardwalk Empire episode — but just a small step. This is often the case with episodes where things happen — they can feel a little rushed and forced, as opposed to the episodes where the characters get to sit around and talk, just being good company. But then all that talk would be meaningless unless every now and then someone got exploded."

Alan Sepinwall of HitFix wrote, "Short of Martin Scorsese calling Winter up to say he'd like to pop over to do another episode, this is the Boardwalk Empire equivalent of breaking out the big guns, and the creative talent is appropriately applied to an episode all about men being surprised to realize the kind of great power they are contending with." Seth Colter Walls of Vulture gave the episode a perfect 5 star rating out of 5 and wrote, "That's all a wind-up for saying that, had you been on the fence about whether to continue on with Boardwalk Empire and its many, many (many) dangling narrative threads, I suspect this episode won your affections for at least the balance of this season. Payoff was everywhere: from the major characters who have seemed stranded so far this season, all the way down to minor, more recent guest stars."

Edward Davis of IndieWire wrote, "A bomb goes off in front of his eyes, the violent blast knocking him unconscious, obliterating the club and wiping his darling Billie Kent from existence." Chris O'Hara of TV Fanatic gave the episode a perfect 5 star rating out of 5 and wrote, "When it comes to influence on Boardwalk Empire, few characters command more than Nucky Thompson. On 'The Pony,' though, Nucky was made to feel like a donkey when he deceived his way into an audience with Andrew Mellon. Nucky does not buck easy, as we know, and he held his ground in the face of the pompous politician, striking an important deal."

Michael Noble of Den of Geek wrote, "The past few episodes have seen Boardwalk Empire firing on all cylinders, and this latest one, 'The Pony', was no exception. In fact, it achieved more than its immediate predecessors, finding room for all but one of the key characters (the still AWOL Chalky), and skilfully blending the private and the public, as well as reducing the gap between plot and character." Michelle Rafferty of Paste gave the episode a 9 out of 10 and wrote, "In contrast to last week's more measured 'Sunday Best,' last night marked one of those rare Boardwalk episodes that squeezed in nearly every character (sans Chalky, sigh) to deliver a number of game changers, one after the other. Payoff is happening, which is as satisfying as it is bittersweet because it means we're nearing the end of this excellent season."
