= What Jesus Said =

- Boardwalk Empire episode
- Episode no.: Season 5 Episode 3
- Directed by: Ed Bianchi
- Written by: Christine Chambers; Howard Korder
- Cinematography by: Jonathan Freeman
- Editing by: Kate Sanford; Eric Lorenz
- Original air date: September 21, 2014
- Running time: 54 minutes

Guest appearances
- Patricia Arquette as Sally Wheet; Matt Letscher as Joe Kennedy; Mary Bacon as Marie; Olivia Nikkanen as Fern; Boris McGiver as Sheriff Jacob Lindsay; John Ellison Conlee as Commodore Louis Kaestner; Travis Tope as Joe Harper; Nolan Lyons as Young Nucky Thompson; Michael Zegen as Bugsy Siegel; Paul Calderón as Arquimedes; Shae D'lyn as Carolyn Rothstein; John C. Vennema as Lawrence Conors

Episode chronology
← Previous "The Good Listener"	Next → "Cuanto"
- Boardwalk Empire (season 5)

"What Jesus Said" is the third episode of the fifth season of the American period crime drama television series Boardwalk Empire. It is the 51st overall episode of the series and was written by Christine Chambers and executive producer Howard Korder, and directed by Ed Bianchi. It was released on HBO on September 21, 2014.

The series is set in Atlantic City, New Jersey, during the Prohibition era of the 1920s. The series follows Enoch "Nucky" Thompson, a political figure who rises to prominence and interacts with mobsters, politicians, government agents, and the common folk who look up to him. In the episode, Nucky meets with Kennedy for a potential partnership, while Chalky and Milton reach a house, where they hold a mother and daughter hostage.

According to Nielsen Media Research, the episode was seen by an estimated 2.11 million household viewers and gained a 0.9 ratings share among adults aged 18–49. The episode received generally positive reviews from critics, who praised the performances and directing, but criticized Chalky's subplot.

== Plot ==
=== 1884 ===
Nucky now works as a bellboy at the Corner Hotel. Part of his duties involve making deliveries. One day, he delivers flowers to a client, and discovers a woman killed in his bedroom and Sheriff Lindsay and the Commodore inside. Nucky receives a postcard from a girl he met earlier that day, inviting him to visit her the following summer. The girl is revealed to be Mabel Jeffries, his future first wife.

=== 1931 ===
In Maryland, Chalky and Milton arrive at a house, discovering a woman, Fern, who lives with her mother Marie. The women have no money, but Milton knows they have a safe as he visited the house years ago. They claim the safe was taken by the father to a bank, so Milton and Chalky debate on what to do. When Milton forces Fern to try on a new dress in front of him, Marie finally reveals they simply moved the safe to another section of the house. Milton becomes aggressive when he believes the safe is not the same as the one he saw years ago. Threatening Fern's life, he forces Marie to open it. However, it only contains liberty bonds, which are worthless for them. When Milton prepares to kill Fern, Chalky kills him with a hammer to the head. Fern retrieves Milton's gun and orders Chalky to leave, giving him just $9.

In New York City, Margaret is questioned about Abe Redstone, as the lawyers are aware that it was Rothstein. Despite his death, the account is still active and they suspect insider trading. Margaret later visits Rothstein's widow, Carolyn, for help, but Carolyn knows she was very involved with Rothstein and demands Rothstein's investments.

In Harlem, Luciano and Siegel meet with Narcisse. Maranzano wants to respect Narcisse's deal with Masseria, but Narcisse refuses to comply, even under threat of repercussions. Later, they kill his henchmen and many of his prostitutes at his brothel.

Nucky returns to Atlantic City. Since the events of last season, Mickey has taken over ownership of the Onyx Club and rebranded it as Old Rumpus. He calls Sally to tell her that while Senator Lloyd is no longer involved in their business, he will talk with Joe Kennedy about a potential partnership. Kennedy visits Atlantic City and is curious about Nucky's lack of family, which makes him hesitate about their partnership. Later, Nucky awakens from sleeping at his office, finding Margaret alongside him. They both exchange a smile.

== Production ==
=== Development ===
In August 2014, HBO confirmed that the third episode of the season would be titled "What Jesus Said", and that it would be written by Christine Chambers and executive producer Howard Korder, and directed by Ed Bianchi. This was Chambers' second writing credit, Korder's 20th writing credit, and Bianchi's sixth directing credit.

== Reception ==
=== Viewers ===
In its original American broadcast, "What Jesus Said" was seen by an estimated 2.11 million household viewers with a 0.9 in the 18-49 demographics. This means that 0.9 percent of all households with televisions watched the episode. This was a 16% increase in viewership from the previous episode, which was watched by 1.81 million household viewers with a 0.7 in the 18-49 demographics.

=== Critical reviews ===
"What Jesus Said" received generally positive reviews from critics. The review aggregator website Rotten Tomatoes reported an 85% approval rating for the episode, based on 13 reviews. The site's consensus states: "Boardwalk Empire continues to explore Nucky's past with satisfying results, though an extended hostage subplot feels a bit superfluous this late in the game."

Matt Fowler of IGN gave the episode a "great" 8.3 out of 10 and wrote in his verdict, "'What Jesus Said' was a fine episode, though it still focused heavily on Nucky tying to hammer out that Bacardi deal - this time, however, with a famous historical figure. Still, it was good to see Nucky back home, and to get confirmation that the theater was still running. Narcisse returned, but briefly. And Chalky still seems to be a beaten down character with no official plan in place. Is he headed toward something or is he to remain in 'survival' mode for a while more still? By default, Margaret's big world change offered up the best part of the episode, as well as a passing farewell to Rothstein."

Alan Sepinwall of HitFix wrote, "With the return of Dr. Narcisse – about to be at war with Luciano's crew – it's tempting to just root for a rematch of season 4's Narcisse/Chalky hostilities. And I'm sure we'll get a reunion before the end. But they're not the only two with unfinished business to be dealt with over the remaining five episodes, and I look forward to whatever the Nucky/Margaret team-up brings." Genevieve Valentine of The A.V. Club gave the episode a "B+" grade and wrote, "Sometimes you get an episode of TV that both does just what it sets out to do and manages to encompass several of the show's head-scratchers in the process. This has always been a show unafraid to introduce new people, but five episodes from the end of the entire series, we spend most of 'What Jesus Said' with guest stars, and in the closing minutes, writers Cristine Chambers and Howard Korder even manage to introduce a third newcomer, as if afraid to run out. There's the objectification and victimization of women that the show must, at this point, consider a quota; certainly the episode approaches both the titillation and the violence with a sense of begrudging duty."

Sarene Leeds of Entertainment Weekly wrote, "It sounds crazy, but we're now more than one-third of the way through Boardwalk Empire's final season. The question is, will the next five episodes be enough to resolve all of the loose subplots still flailing around from Chicago to New York to Atlantic City to Cuba to wherever the hell Chalky White is? Already it feels like certain characters are being sacrificed for the greater good of giving Nucky a Walter White or Don Draper-worthy send-off." Craig D. Lindsey of Vulture gave the episode a 3 star rating out of 5 and wrote, "As satisfactory as most of the ep was, I couldn't help thinking the whole Chalky and Buck subplot was suspenseful but superfluous."

Rodrigo Perez of IndieWire wrote, "A slower episode than last, Boardwalk Empire is getting back into a familiar groove and rhythm, and I'm again reminded why this show is worthwhile. For one, it just doesn’t deign to spoonfeed you any information. You either catch it or you don’t and really its full of rewards for the hardcore viewer who's paying close attention. But I also wonder if the show has been too smart for its own good and this is why it's lost viewers. Regardless, the storytelling is intelligent, subtle and elegant, even when the pace is leisurely." Chris O'Hara of TV Fanatic gave the episode a 4.5 star rating out of 5 and wrote, "It was good to have Chalky back, but to have him spend an entire episode in that house with Milton was regrettable. Milton did surprise me with how observant he was to notice the lack of any male presence in the home, but far too much screen time was given to a character who would eventually meet his end after being featured in only two episodes."

Tony Sokol of Den of Geek gave the episode a 4.5 star rating out of 5 and wrote, "Hello and goodbye to Buck. This was an intense character, a shooting star on Boardwalk Empire. Buck started out as the happy singing stripie, all chuckles and dented head. Making the boss man smile, but shit. Once he got himself a gun, that man was gone, off and running with a sidekick who knew how to use a telephone in tow." Paste gave the episode a 7.3 out of 10 rating and wrote, "Boardwalk Empire has never felt like a terribly self-aware series. You always get the sense that its creators have absolute confidence in their work, even as it's going horribly wrong, week after week. However, 'What Jesus Said' seemed interested in addressing the show's central problem, the thing that's kept it from ever rising above a certain level. Unfortunately, it did so by drawing attention to the problem, without actually resolving it."
