= The Good Listener =

- Boardwalk Empire episode
- Episode no.: Season 5 Episode 2
- Directed by: Allen Coulter
- Written by: Terence Winter
- Cinematography by: Bill Coleman
- Editing by: Tim Streeto
- Original air date: September 14, 2014
- Running time: 55 minutes

Guest appearances
- Anatol Yusef as Meyer Lansky; Ian Hart as Ethan Thompson; Chris Caldovino as Tonino Sandrelli; Domenick Lombardozzi as Ralph Capone; Matt Letscher as Joe Kennedy; Greg Antonacci as Johnny Torrio; Michael Zegen as Bugsy Siegel; Boris McGiver as Sheriff Jacob Lindsay; John Ellison Conlee as Commodore Louis Kaestner; Louis Cancelmi as Mike D'Angelo; Jim True-Frost as Eliot Ness; Erin Dilly as Elenore Thompson; Christiane Seidel as Sigrid Mueller; Reg Rogers as Robert Hodge; Paul Calderón as Arquimedes; Michael Countryman as Frank Wilson; Giampiero Judica as Salvatore Maranzano; Paul Fitzgerald as Charles Gabler; Richard Bekins as Theodore Rollins; Nolan Lyons as Young Nucky Thompson; Oakes Fegley as Young Eli Thompson

Episode chronology
| ← Previous "Golden Days for Boys and Girls" | Next → "What Jesus Said" |
- Boardwalk Empire (season 5)

"The Good Listener" is the second episode of the fifth season of the American period crime drama television series Boardwalk Empire. It is the 50th overall episode of the series and was written by series creator Terence Winter, and directed by producer Allen Coulter. It was released on HBO on September 14, 2014.

The series is set in Atlantic City, New Jersey, during the Prohibition era of the 1920s. The series follows Enoch "Nucky" Thompson, a political figure who rises to prominence and interacts with mobsters, politicians, government agents, and the common folk who look up to him. In the episode, Nucky asks Torrio for help in his assassination attempt, while Eli's life in Chicago is revealed.

According to Nielsen Media Research, the episode was seen by an estimated 1.81 million household viewers and gained a 0.7 ratings share among adults aged 18–49. The episode received extremely positive reviews from critics, who deemed the episode as an improvement over the premiere, praising the performances and more focused narrative.

== Plot ==
=== 1884 ===
Nucky's sister Susan dies from her illness, devastating the family. Nucky later meets with the Commodore, informing him of her death. The Commodore then visits the Thompsons to offer money, but is forced to leave when Ethan pulls out a shotgun, due to a previous bad encounter with the Commodore. Nucky's father pockets the money and leaves the rest of the burial to Nucky, much to his mother's despair

=== 1931 ===
In New Jersey, Gillian is now living in a women's sanitarium mandated by the court. In the past seven years, she has overcome her heroin addiction. Gillian complies with the hospital's rules, while also making a deal with a worker to get paper.

In Chicago, Eli is revealed to have become an alcoholic since he arrived. He escapes from a warehouse raided by Eliot Ness and the Untouchables. The warehouse is owned by Capone, so Capone's henchman, Mike D'Angelo, orders Van Alden to make up for the lost revenue, since Eli was in charge of the warehouse and he answers to Van Alden. Van Alden's marriage is also dying, as his relationship with Sigrid is becoming more strained. Eli and Van Alden repay Capone by robbing Jake Guzik and his henchmen under disguise. Meanwhile, government agent Frank J. Wilson investigates Capone for tax evasion, while it is revealed that D'Angelo is an undercover agent who works for him. Simultaneously, Capone’s brain is deteriorating due to years of cocaine addiction and early signs of syphilis, causing him to become increasingly paranoid and irrational.

In New York, Nucky meets with the retired Torrio, suspecting that Lansky was involved in his assassination attempt in Cuba. As this coincides with the murder of Masseria, Torrio arranges a meeting between Nucky and Salvatore Maranzano. Maranzano claims that Nucky is not a problem for him, while Luciano denies being involved in the hit, as he hasn't talked with Lansky. Later, Lansky is revealed to be conspiring with Luciano, Bugsy Siegel and Tonino to take over Maranzano’s empire, as Luciano has grown weary of Maranzano only doing business with Sicilians.

Nucky also tries to form a partnership with a company, but the members reject him due to his criminal past, although he catches Joe Kennedy's interest.

In Brooklyn, Willie is now a law graduate and is applying for a prosecutor position. However, the Attorney rejects his application upon discovering that he is related to Nucky. Willie convinces him in giving him a chance.

Nucky later meets with Tonino at a restaurant, who confirms that Luciano and Lansky were involved in the assassination attempt. Tonino offers to work for Nucky, who seems interested. When Nucky leaves, Tonino finds that there was a boardwalk caricature of Billie Kent right above their table, and sees Arquimedes staring at him. Later, Lansky is alerted in a brothel about a murder. He goes outside, discovering a dead Tonino with a knife in the back, with a postcard reading "Greetings from Havana".

== Production ==
=== Development ===
In August 2014, HBO confirmed that the second episode of the season would be titled "The Good Listener", and that it would be written by series creator Terence Winter, and directed by producer Allen Coulter. This was Winter's 13th writing credit, and Coulter's tenth directing credit.

== Reception ==
=== Viewers ===
In its original American broadcast, "The Good Listener" was seen by an estimated 1.81 million household viewers with a 0.7 in the 18-49 demographics. This means that 0.7 percent of all households with televisions watched the episode. This was a 24% decrease in viewership from the previous episode, which was watched by 2.37 million household viewers with a 0.9 in the 18-49 demographics.

=== Critical reviews ===
"The Good Listener" received extremely positive reviews from critics. The review aggregator website Rotten Tomatoes reported an 100% approval rating for the episode, based on 12 reviews. The site's consensus states: "'The Good Listener' aptly picks up the pace after the gradual setup of 'Golden Days for Boys and Girls,' purposefully advancing what is becoming an exciting arc for the final season."

Matt Fowler of IGN gave the episode a "great" 8.8 out of 10 and wrote in his verdict, "'The Good Listener' started to sew together a lot of the vague elements from the season premiere, weaving a clearer picture of what this final season will hold. I still enjoyed the Nucky flashbacks, but this week I really liked how the story itself, despite the big time jump, tied things back to the past. Specifically Season 3."

Alan Sepinwall of HitFix wrote, "But the show has always been about Nucky's story, right or wrong, and 'The Good Listener' plays interestingly off of the ways that this show's main character has become such a minor supporting player in the big action happening in Chicago and New York." Genevieve Valentine of The A.V. Club gave the episode an "A–" grade and wrote, "'The Good Listener,' written by Terence Winter, is just such an episode. It covers as much ground as, if not more, than 'Golden Days for Boys and Girls,' but despite ragged subplots, new characters, and unexpected settings, it doesn't have the premiere's burden of establishing the new era. Instead, it uses characters running out of options in inverse proportion to how hilariously awful it all is, and it works to spin the threads that connect people who wouldn't expect it, hamstring those who are hoping to skate by, and thwart some desperate souls trying to believe whatever it is gets you out of this mess."

Sarene Leeds of Entertainment Weekly wrote, "Michael Shannon being asked to pet an old biddy's little dog, Daisy, while the other lady's long hat feather keeps getting stuck in Shea Whigham's nostrils? Best moment of TV this week." Craig D. Lindsey of Vulture gave the episode a perfect 5 star rating out of 5 and wrote, "Written by Terence Winter and directed by Allen Coulter, 'The Good Listener' crackles more plotwise than last week's leisurely-paced season opener, setting up more action and conflict that’ll permeate the season."

Rodrigo Perez of IndieWire wrote, "Written by showrunner Terence Winter himself, this episode moves with much more compelling purpose. Nucky's flashbacks to his difficult childhood are still an integral part of the show, but this time they hold a greater emotional weight. Plus the narrative is moving at a far less leisurely pace, and these recollections feel a bit more artful." Chris O'Hara of TV Fanatic gave the episode a perfect 5 star rating out of 5 and wrote, "The road to becoming a career criminal is along and dangerous one, but despite all its peril, walking away can often be the most daunting challenge."

Tony Sokol of Den of Geek gave the episode a 4 star rating out of 5 and wrote, "Intrigue and murder abound. Nucky is still a gracious enough guest to leave a 'Welcome To Atlantic City' postcard. Eli Thompson may sob uncontrollably during radio comedy hours, but he still knows enough to pop a cap behind the ears of any witnesses. It’s always pandemonium with him." Paste gave the episode a 7.3 out of 10 rating and wrote, "There was a lot more good than bad this week, and things were far less fragmentary. Most scenes felt like they had an overall purpose, and weren't just there for shock value or exposition. Essentially, there is a story now, where there really wasn't last week. I can't say that it's my favorite episode of Boardwalk Empire, but it helped the show move past an early speedbump, and made me at least a bit excited for what's to come."
