= Family Limitation (Boardwalk Empire) =

- Boardwalk Empire episode
- Jimmy takes his revenge on Sheridan
- Episode no.: Season 1 Episode 6
- Directed by: Tim Van Patten
- Written by: Howard Korder
- Original air date: October 24, 2010
- Running time: 60 minutes

Guest appearances
- Gretchen Mol as Gillian Darmody; Greg Antonacci as Johnny Torrio; Edoardo Ballerini as Ignacious D'Alessio; Dana Ivey as Mrs. McGarry; Peter McRobbie as Supervisor Elliot; Chris Mulkey as Senator Walter Edge; Frank Shattuck as Charlie Sheridan; Erik Weiner as Agent Sebso

Episode chronology
← Previous "Nights in Ballygran"	Next → "Home"

"Family Limitation" is the sixth episode of the first season of the HBO television series Boardwalk Empire, which premiered October 24, 2010. It was written by supervising producer Howard Korder and directed by executive producer Tim Van Patten.

== Plot ==
Two of the D'Alessio brothers rob one of Nucky's bagmen on the Boardwalk in broad daylight. Because the thieves are perceived to be Italian, Nucky suspects Luciano is behind the robbery. Margaret asks Mrs. McGarry, the chairwoman of the Temperance League, for advice on whether to accept Nucky's offer to move in with him. Though uncomfortable with Nucky not offering his hand in marriage first, Mrs. McGarry advises her to do as she sees fit and gives her a Sanger pamphlet on birth control. Luciano, who is sleeping with Gillian, confides in her his frequent problem with impotence caused by recurring gonorrhea. He is informed by Rothstein that Gillian is not Jimmy's wife, but rather his mother.

In Chicago, Jimmy advises Torrio against ordering a "retreat" from their interests in Sheridan's territory, since it will only make them look weak. He also spends more time with Capone and his family, inadvertently discovering that Al's son Sonny, whom he passes off as an "idiot", is actually deaf. After reconciling with Sheridan, the hotel's coat checker hands Jimmy and Capone concealed guns, which they use to kill Sheridan and his men.

Jimmy is effused with praise from Torrio for organizing the ambush, which angers Capone and leads him and Jimmy to trade insults over Jimmy's weak nerves and Capone lies about his service. Capone later visits Jimmy and gifts him a package of steaks; the two men make up and Capone admits his fear over how Sonny's disability will affect his future. Jimmy encourages Capone not to give up hope that modern medicine might find a way to help his son.

An emboldened Margaret moves in with Nucky, and quits her job at the dress shop after getting belittled by Lucy. Nucky invites Margaret to join him for a magic show later that evening, but when Mayor Hague asks him to dinner so that the two men can discuss politics and the road funding bill, he blows her off without a second thought. Margaret then learns from one of her neighbors, Annabelle, that it isn't unusual for a powerful man in Atlantic City to keep a "concubine" in his household.

Eli brings in Luciano and roughs him up; despite Luciano arguing that he knows nothing about the robbery, Nucky sends him away with a warning not to mess with his people. Meanwhile, Van Alden's superiors refuse to give him the resources to build a case against Nucky for lack of evidence, and reprimand him for being lax in his duties as a Bureau of Prohibition agent. That night, while going through Margaret's records, he finds a photograph of a 16-year-old Margaret in her immigration file. He then performs self-mortification with a leather strap from his suitcase to cure himself of his lust for her.

== First appearances ==
- Sonny Capone: Al and Mae Capone's deaf-mute son and Teresina Capone's grandson.
- Mae Capone: Al Capone's Irish-American wife, Teresina's daughter-in-law and Sonny's mother.
- Teresina Capone: Al Capone's mother, Mae Capone's mother-in-law, Sonny Capone's paternal grandmother, Gabrielle Capone's wife and an Italian immigrant.
- Annabelle: A former mistress of Nucky's at the Ritz-Carlton who is now dating Harry Prince.

== Deaths ==
- 3 Sheridan Henchmen: Shot to death by Jimmy Darmody and Al Capone.
- Charlie Sheridan: A Chicago mob boss, Capone and Torrio's rival and the owner of Greektown. He is shot to death by Jimmy Darmody on orders of Torrio for attacking the Four Deuces.

== Reception ==
=== Critical reception ===
IGN gave the episode a score of 8.5 enjoying the relationship between Al and Jimmy: "Another highlight is the relationship between Al and Jimmy, as they rise up the ranks of the Torrio crime family. The two debate the difference between 'buddy' and 'accomplice' as Jimmy plans how to take out Sheridan. During this time, Jimmy, a war veteran, calls out Al on his bullshit war record, which in turn makes Al look like he is overcompensating for being nothing more than a thug in a nice suit. These exchanges prove that Al and Jimmy may have been friends once, but are on a path to being something much worse as their underworld careers advance."

The A.V. Club gave it a B+ rating.

=== Ratings ===
"Family Limitation" slipped back to a 1.2 adults 18–49 rating after last week's 1.3 rating. The episode had a total of 2.812 million viewers.
