= Search and Destroy (1995 film) =

- Theatrical Release Poster
- Directed by: David Salle
- Written by: Play: Howard Korder; Screenplay: Michael Almereyda
- Produced by: Ruth Charny; Elie Cohn; Dan Lupovitz
- Starring: Griffin Dunne; Rosanna Arquette; Illeana Douglas; Ethan Hawke; Dennis Hopper; John Turturro; Christopher Walken
- Cinematography: Bobby Bukowski; Michael Spiller
- Edited by: Lawrence Blume; Michelle Gorchow
- Music by: Elmer Bernstein
- Distributed by: October Films
- Release date: April 28, 1995 (U.S.)
- Running time: 90 minutes
- Country: United States
- Language: English
- Budget: $4,000,000 (est.)
- Box office: $389,503

Search and Destroy is a 1995 drama film based on a stage play by Howard Korder and directed by David Salle. The film stars Griffin Dunne, repeating his role from the stage production, Rosanna Arquette, Illeana Douglas, Ethan Hawke, Dennis Hopper, John Turturro and Christopher Walken, and features Martin Scorsese as "The Accountant." Salle was nominated for the Grand Special Prize at the Deauville American Film Festival.

== Plot ==
Middle-aged Martin Mirkhein (Griffin Dunne) is a complete failure. He has run a successful business into debt, his marriage is falling apart, and now he owes the IRS $147,956 in back taxes. Martin may not have much going for him but he has read "Daniel Strong," a best-selling, self-help novel by the popular TV guru Dr. Waxling (Dennis Hopper). Now he wants to turn the novel into a major motion picture. To do that, Martin needs the rights and the revenue. Given his grating personality and terrible track record, it won't be easy to get hold of either. He sets out to meet with Dr. Waxling but ends up sleeping with Waxling's screenwriter-assistant Marie (Illeana Douglas) instead. Determined to make a movie, Martin and Marie move to New York. There, they get involved with wealthy Kim Ulander (Christopher Walken), an enigmatic businessman with quirky tendencies and a repressed desire to live dangerously. If they aren't careful, this daring duo may not come out of this deal alive.

== Cast ==
- Griffin Dunne as Martin Mirkheim
- Dennis Hopper as Dr. Luther Waxling
- Christopher Walken as Kim Ulander
- John Turturro as Ron
- Ethan Hawke as Roger
- Rosanna Arquette as Lauren Mirkheim
- Robert Knepper as Daniel Strong
- Illeana Douglas as Marie Davenport
- Martin Scorsese as The Accountant
- Jason Ferraro as Young Daniel Strong
- David Thornton as Rob
- Karole Armitage as Red River Valley Dancer
- Dan Hedaya as Tailor

== Reception ==
Search and Destroy received a generally negative response from film critics and maintains a 38% positive rating at Rotten Tomatoes.

The film critic Peter Rainer of the Los Angeles Times praised the film, writing, "Smart and facetious, Search and Destroy is the kind of film that [...] flaunts its pushiness. It may be a little cackle of a movie, but it's not like anything else out there right now. Salle, whose artwork often combines abstract doodling and lyric realism on the same canvas, attempts something similar here with his visual scheme and tonal shifts. The collision of gags and rhapsody is off-putting; as the film goes on, our laughter keeps getting undercut by small terrors. The mixture of moods keeps you off balance. Search and Destroy [...] is not as easy to dismiss as you might wish it to be. It keeps outsmarting you."

Conversely, Emanuel Levy of Variety gave the film a negative review, writing that it "aspires to be an inventive black comedy of the absurd with sharp social commentary, but instead is a disappointing film with few bright moments and many more tedious ones." He added, "Major talent behind the cameras and a dream cast of eccentric actors only partially overcome the trappings of a misconceived film that is poorly directed."
