= Ed Bianchi =

American television director

Edward Bianchi
- Born: April 24, 1942 (age 84); Paterson, New Jersey
- Occupations: Television director, television producer, film director. commercial director
- Years active: 1980–present
- Spouse: Carla Bianchi
- Children: 3

Edward Bianchi (born April 24, 1942) is an American television director and producer. He is better known for his work on Deadwood, Boardwalk Empire, Yellowstone, and The Get Down.

== Career ==
Prior to Deadwood, Bianchi directed several music videos for Luther Vandross and the dance title sequence of each season of The Cosby Show.

From 1976 to 1995 he directed hundreds of commercials for clients such as: American Express, Pepsi Cola, Coca-Cola, Dr. Pepper, Eastern Airlines, Jello Pudding and the Jamaica Tourist Board. Bianchi won every major Commercial award including in 1985 "The Director's Guild Award" for The Best commercial Director of the year.

Bianchi directed Homicide Life on the Street in 1998 for creator Tom Fontana. It was his first TV show as a director. In 2002 he went on to direct the drama "The Wire " the HBO series created by David Simon. It told the story of the drugs wars in Baltimore MD. He directed 4 episodes including ep 105 "The Wire".

Bianchi joined the crew of Deadwood of the HBO western drama Deadwood as a director for the first season in 2004. The series was created by David Milch and focused on a growing town in the American West. Bianchi directed the episodes "The Trial of Jack McCall" and "No Other Sons or Daughters". Bianchi was hired as a producer for the second season in 2005 and continued to regularly direct episodes. He directed the two part season premiere "A Lie Agreed Upon", "Amalgamation and Capital" and the season finale "Boy-the-Earth-Talks-To". Bianchi and the production staff were nominated for the Emmy Award for Outstanding Drama Series at the 57th Primetime Emmy Awards for their work on the second season. Bianchi left the production staff after the second season but returned as a director for the third and final season in 2006. He directed the episodes "Full Faith and Credit" and "Leviathan Smiles". In 2011 he joined the show creator Mitch Glazer as co executive producer of the STARZ's original series Magic City. It focus on the hotel business in 1959 in Miami Beach. He directed 4 of the 8 episodes in the first season and season 4 - Episode 13, “Toast Can’t Never Be Bread”

Bianchi is married to Carla Bianchi who appeared on Deadwood as the character of Mary Stokes and in Magic City as the character Peggy Reef. The couple have three children: Adam, Alan and Stella.

== Filmography ==
Film

- The Two Mr. Kissels (2008)
- Off and Running (1991)
- The Fan (1981)

Television

| Year | Title | Episode(s) |
|---|---|---|
| 2019 | Yellowstone | "A Thundering" |
| 2019 | Yellowstone | ”New Beginnings” |
| 2018 | Seven Seconds | "Boxed Devil" |
| 2018 | Seven Seconds | "A Boy and a Bike" |
| 2017 | Get Shorty | "A Man of Letters" |
| 2017 | The Get Down | "Only from Exile Can We Come Home" |
| 2017 | The Get Down | "Gamble Everything" |
| 2017 | The Get Down | "The Beat Says, This Is the Way" |
| 2016 | The Get Down | "Raise Your Words, Not Your Voice" |
| 2016 | The Get Down | "Forget Safety, Be Notorious" |
| 2016 | The Get Down | "Seek Those Who Fan Your Flames" |
| 2015 | Bates Motel | "The Last Supper" |
| 2014 | Boardwalk Empire | "King of Norway" |
| 2014 | Boardwalk Empire | "What Jesus Said" |
| 2014 | Turn: Washington's Spies | "Who by Fire" |
| 2014 | Bates Motel | "Plunge" |
| 2013 | Boardwalk Empire | "Marriage and Hunting" |
| 2013 | Boardwalk Empire | "All In" |
| 2012 | Boardwalk Empire | "The Milkmaid's Lot" |
| 2012 | Boardwalk Empire | "Ging Gang Goolie" |
| 2011 | Boardwalk Empire | "What Does the Bee Do?" |
| 2011 | The Killing | "The Cage" |
| 2010 | Men of a Certain Age | "If I Could, I Surely Would" |
| 2010 | Men of a Certain Age | "Father's Fraternity" |
| 2010 | Mercy | "I Saw This Pig and I Thought of You" |
| 2010 | Hawthorne | "The Starting Line" |
| 2010 | Rubicon | "Caught in the Suck" |
| 2009 | Men of a Certain Age | "The New Guy" |
| 2009 | Hawthorne | "Trust Me" |
| 2009 | Heroes | "Jump, Push, Fall" |
| 2009 | Kings | "The New King: Part One" |
| 2009 | Kings | "Pilgrimage" |
| 2009 | The Unusuals | "The E.I.D." |
| 2009 | Damages | "You Got Your Prom Date Pregnant" |
| 2008 | Brotherhood | "The Chimes at Midnight" |
| 2008 | Brotherhood | "Let Rome Into Tiber Melt" |
| 2007 | Brotherhood | "Things Have Changed 1:7-8" |
| 2007 | Brotherhood | "Dear Landlord 1:3-4" |
| 2007 | Mad Men | "Marriage of Figaro" |
| 2007 | Damages | "I Hate These People" |
| 2007 | John from Cincinnati | "His Visit, Day Four" |
| 2006 | Brotherhood | "Matthew 22:10" |
| 2006 | Brotherhood | "Matthew 5:6" |
| 2006 | Brotherhood | "Genesis 27:29" |
| 2006 | Deadwood | "Leviathan Smiles" |
| 2006 | Deadwood | "Full Faith and Credit" |
| 2006 | Heist | "Bury the Lead" |
| 2006 | Heist | "How Billy Got His Groove Back" |
| 2006 | The Bedford Diaries | "Tell Me No Secrets" |
| 2006 | Waterfront | "Street Fight" |
| 2005 | Deadwood | "Boy the Earth Talks To" |
| 2005 | Deadwood | "Amalgamation and Capital" |
| 2005 | Deadwood | "A Lie Agreed Upon, Part 2" |
| 2005 | Deadwood | "A Lie Agreed Upon, Part 1" |
| 2004 | Deadwood | "No Other Son or Daughters" |
| 2004 | Deadwood | "The Trial of Jack McCall" |
| 2004 | The Jury | "Three Boys and a Gun" |
| 2004 | The Wire | "Time after Time" |
| 2003 | The Wire | "Collateral Damage" |
| 2003 | The Wire | "Ebb Tide" |
| 2002 | The Wire | "The Wire" |
| 2000 | The Beat | |
| 1999 | Law & Order: Special Victims Unit | "Ritual" |
| 1998 | Homicide: Life on the Street | "Red, Red Wine" |
| 1998 | Homicide: Life on the Street | "Secrets" |
