= Louis Cancelmi =

American actor (active 2003– )

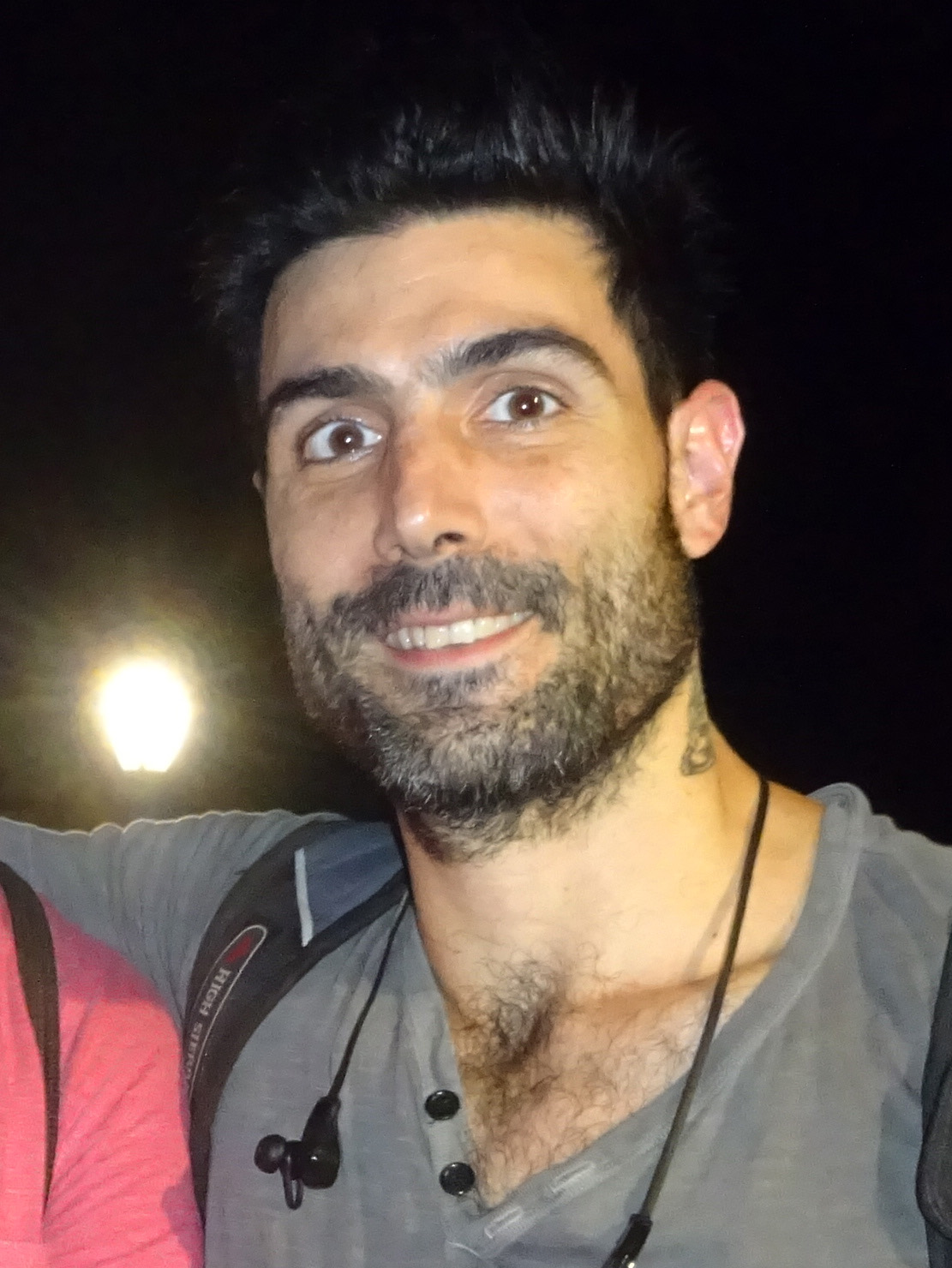
- Cancelmi in 2016
- Born: Pittsburgh, Pennsylvania, U.S.
- Education: Yale University (BA)
- Occupation: Actor
- Years active: 2003–present
- Spouse: Elisabeth Waterston
- Relatives: Annie Parisse (sister); Katherine Waterston (sister-in-law); Sam Waterston (father-in-law); Paul Sparks (brother-in-law)

Louis Cancelmi is an American stage and film actor.

== Early life ==
Cancelmi was born in Pittsburgh, the son of Annette, a teacher, and Louis G. Cancelmi, a senior executive with Alaska Airlines. He is of Italian, Slovak, and Syrian heritage. His family relocated to California, then to Anchorage, and then to Seattle, with Anchorage being Cancelmi's self-identified hometown. He is the brother of actress Annie Parisse.

Cancelmi started acting in high school plays. He attended Yale College, entering with interests in writing and mathematics but ultimately majoring in theater.

== Career ==
Cancelmi is a frequent performer in productions by the Public Theater, both at their Astor Library home and at the Delacorte Theater in Central Park. He is best known for appearing in Boardwalk Empire (2014), Blue Bloods (2015–2016), The Irishman (2019), and Killers of the Flower Moon (2023).

== Personal life ==
He is married to Elisabeth Waterston, daughter of Sam Waterston, with whom Cancelmi acted in Please Be Normal in 2014 and Shakespeare in the Park's The Tempest in 2015. The couple lives in the Hudson Valley with their children.

== Filmography ==
=== Film ===
Key
†	Denotes films that have not yet been released

Year	Title	Role	Notes
2003	New Guy	Winston	
2003	Si' Laraby	Balkanin	
2009	First Person Singular	Louis	
2010	Gabi on the Roof in July	Garrett	
2011	Green	Dustin	
2011	The Ride of Tom & Valkyrie	Miguel	
2012	Gayby	Louis	
2012	Gayby: Deleted Scenes	Louis	Video short; uncredited
2014	The Amazing Spider-Man 2	Man in Black Suit	
2014	Please Be Normal	Victor	
2015	Manhattan Romance	Jarrod	
2015	Funny Bunny	Peter	
2015	And It Was Good	Sesto Basti	
2016	Tramps	Jimmy	
2017	Fits and Starts	Daniel	
2019	Windows on the World	Miguel	
2019	Mass Hysteria	Giles	
2019	21 Bridges	Bush	
2019	The Irishman	Sally Bugs	
2019	Inez & Doug & Kira	John	
2019	Team Marco	Richie	
2020	Give or Take	Terrence	
2021	The Eyes of Tammy Faye	Richard Fletcher	
2023	Killers of the Flower Moon	Kelsie Morrison	
2023	Pet Shop Days	Walker	
2025	Sorry, Baby	Preston Decker	
2025	In the Hand of Dante	Lefty / Guido da Polenta	
2026	The Bride!	Officer Goodman	
2026	Mayday	Major Sanders	

=== Television ===
Year	Title	Role	Notes
2001, 2010	Law & Order: Criminal Intent	Phil / Bernard	2 episodes
2003	Third Watch	Victor Tanzi	Episode: "A Ticket Grows in Brooklyn"
2007	Law & Order	Malcolm Yates	Episode: "Talking Points"
2011	Untitled Jersey City Project	Philip Haney	Episode: "Episode 3"
2012	Americana	Georges Stannis	TV movie
2014	Boardwalk Empire	Mike D'Angelo / Mike Malone	6 episodes
2015	Elementary	Ben Reynolds	Episode: "The Female of the Species"
2015	Inside Amy Schumer	Pierre	Episode: "Foam"
2015	OM City	Desmond	Episode: "Think of Others"
2015	Chicago P.D.	Charlie Koslo	Episode: "Never Forget I Love You"
2015–2016	Blue Bloods	Thomas Wilder	3 episodes
2016	The Blacklist	Gaia	Episode: "Gaia (No. 81)"
2016–2023	Billions	Victor Mateo	Recurring cast
2018	The Looming Tower	Vince Stuart	Main cast
2019	Godfather of Harlem	Richie Zambrano	Episode: "By Whatever Means Necessary"
2022	Kindred	Carlo	4 episodes
2023	A Murder at the End of the World	Todd Andrews	Main cast
2024	The Penguin	Rex Calabrese	2 episodes
2025	Government Cheese	Jean-Guy Prevost	5 episodes
