= Howard Korder =

American screenwriter and playwright

- Born: Howard Korder
- Occupation: Writer
- Writing career
- Period: 20th century

Howard Korder is an American screenwriter and playwright. He is the author of the 1988 coming-of-age play Boys' Life, which earned him a Pulitzer Prize for Drama nomination. His play Search and Destroy was adapted into a film in 1995.

Among the screenplays he has written are The Passion of Ayn Rand and Lakeview Terrace. He is also one of the writers of Boardwalk Empire.
