= Boardwalk Empire =

American period crime drama television series

- Genre: Crime drama; Period drama; Serial drama
- Created by: Terence Winter
- Based on: Boardwalk Empire: The Birth, High Times, and Corruption of Atlantic City by Nelson Johnson
- Showrunner: Terence Winter
- Starring: Steve Buscemi; Michael Pitt; Kelly Macdonald; Michael Shannon; Shea Whigham; Aleksa Palladino; Michael Stuhlbarg; Stephen Graham; Vincent Piazza; Paz de la Huerta; Michael Kenneth Williams; Anthony Laciura; Paul Sparks; Dabney Coleman; Jack Huston; Gretchen Mol; Charlie Cox; Bobby Cannavale; Ron Livingston; Jeffrey Wright; Ben Rosenfield
- Theme music composer: The Brian Jonestown Massacre
- Opening theme: "Straight Up and Down"
- Country of origin: United States
- Original language: English
- No. of seasons: 5
- No. of episodes: 56 (list of episodes)

Production
- Executive producers: Terence Winter; Martin Scorsese; Mark Wahlberg; Tim Van Patten; Howard Korder; Stephen Levinson
- Production location: New York City
- Editors: Kate Stanford; Tim Streeto
- Camera setup: Single-camera
- Running time: 55–73 minutes
- Production companies: HBO Entertainment; Leverage Entertainment; Closest to the Hole Productions; Sikelia Productions; Cold Front Productions

Original release
- Network: HBO
- Release: September 19, 2010 – October 26, 2014

Boardwalk Empire is an American period crime drama television series created by Terence Winter for the premium cable channel HBO. The series is set chiefly in Atlantic City, New Jersey, during the Prohibition era of the 1920s. The series stars Steve Buscemi as Nucky Thompson. Winter, a Primetime Emmy Award-winning screenwriter and producer, created the show, inspired by Nelson Johnson's 2002 non-fiction book Boardwalk Empire: The Birth, High Times, and Corruption of Atlantic City, about the historical criminal kingpin Enoch L. Johnson.

The pilot episode was directed by Martin Scorsese and produced at a cost of $18 million. On September 1, 2009, HBO picked up the series for an additional 11 episodes. The series premiered on September 19, 2010, and its five-season run of 56 episodes ended on October 26, 2014.

Boardwalk Empire received widespread critical acclaim throughout its run, particularly for its visual style and basis on historical figures, as well as for Buscemi's lead performance. The series received 57 Primetime Emmy Award nominations, including two for Outstanding Drama Series, winning 20. The series also won the Golden Globe Award for Best Television Series – Drama in 2011 and two Screen Actors Guild Awards for Outstanding Performance by an Ensemble in a Drama Series in 2011 and 2012.

== Series overview ==
Boardwalk Empire is a period drama focusing on Enoch "Nucky" Thompson (based on the historical Enoch L. Johnson), a political figure who rises to prominence and controls Atlantic City, New Jersey, during the Prohibition period of the 1920s and 1930s. Nucky interacts with historical characters in both his personal and political life, including mobsters, politicians, government agents, and the common folk who look up to him. The federal government also takes an interest in the bootlegging and other illegal activities in the area, sending agents to investigate possible mob connections as well as Nucky's lifestyle—expensive and lavish for a county political figure. The final season jumps ahead seven years to 1931 as Prohibition nears its end.

== Cast and characters ==
=== Main cast ===
- Steve Buscemi as Enoch "Nucky" Thompson – the corrupt treasurer of Atlantic County and its most powerful political figure. He is often involved with various mafias and mobs out of New York and Chicago, as well as bootlegging liquor throughout Atlantic City. He is loosely based on the Atlantic City political boss Enoch L. Johnson.
- Michael Pitt as James "Jimmy" Darmody (seasons 1–2) – Nucky's onetime protégé, an honor student who left Princeton to serve in World War I. He works briefly for Nucky before striking out on his own into organized crime. He is married to Angela, and is the son of Gillian Darmody and Commodore Louis Kaestner.
- Kelly Macdonald as Margaret Thompson – a young widow and mother who turns to Nucky for help out of an abusive marriage, becoming his mistress and later his wife.
- Michael Shannon as Nelson Van Alden / George Mueller – a former straitlaced Bureau of Prohibition agent on the run. Under the alias "George Mueller", he becomes a bootlegger in the Chicago area working as the muscle for Dean O'Banion's organization and in Johnny Torrio's organization.
- Shea Whigham as Elias "Eli" Thompson – Nucky's younger brother and sheriff of Atlantic County, who works as part of Nucky's organization and later Al Capone's organization. He has numerous children, including eldest son Willie. He is based on Alf Johnson.
- Aleksa Palladino as Angela Darmody (seasons 1–2) – Jimmy's wife and the mother of his young son.
- Michael Stuhlbarg as Arnold Rothstein (seasons 1–4) – a powerful New York City gangster and multimillionaire who does business with Nucky. Charlie Luciano, Meyer Lansky, and Benjamin Siegel work for him.
- Stephen Graham as Al Capone – a violent Chicago gangster who is the right-hand man of Chicago crime boss Johnny Torrio.
- Vincent Piazza as Charles "Lucky" Luciano – a hot-headed young New York City gangster and associate of Rothstein's.
- Paz de la Huerta as Lucy Danziger (seasons 1–2) – Nucky's former mistress who gets involved with Van Alden.
- Michael Kenneth Williams as Albert "Chalky" White – a powerful African-American gangster in Atlantic City.
- Anthony Laciura as Edward Anselm "Eddie" Kessler (seasons 1–4) – Nucky's loyal butler.
- Paul Sparks as Mieczyslaw "Mickey Doyle" Kuzik – a doltish Atlantic City bootlegger who works under Nucky.
- Dabney Coleman as Commodore Louis Kaestner (seasons 1–2) – Nucky's mentor and predecessor in Atlantic City, and Jimmy's father. The character of Kaestner is loosely based on Louis Kuehnle.
  - John Ellison Conlee as young Louis Kaestner (recurring season 5).
- Jack Huston as Richard Harrow (seasons 2–4; recurring season 1) – a former Army marksman who allies with Jimmy. Disfigured in the war, he wears a tin mask over half of his face.
- Gretchen Mol as Gillian Darmody (seasons 2–5; recurring season 1) – Jimmy's mother and Nucky's longtime friend.
- Charlie Cox as Owen Sleater (season 3; recurring season 2) – an Irish Republican Army volunteer who works for Nucky and has an affair with Margaret.
- Bobby Cannavale as Giuseppe "Gyp" Rosetti (season 3) – a ruthless gangster who challenges Nucky.
- Ron Livingston as Roy Phillips (season 4) – a Pinkerton detective who poses as a wealthy out-of-town businessman who gets involved with Gillian Darmody to prosecute her for murder.
- Jeffrey Wright as Dr. Valentin Narcisse (seasons 4–5) – a Harlem-based philanthropist, doctor of divinity, and follower of Marcus Garvey's, who plans to take over the heroin trade in Atlantic City. The character was inspired by Casper Holstein.
- Ben Rosenfield as Willie Thompson (season 5; recurring season 4) – Eli's eldest son, a Temple University student and later a lawyer with the United States Department of Justice.
  - Kevin Csolak as young Willie Thompson (recurring season 3).

=== Recurring characters ===
- Greg Antonacci as Johnny Torrio – boss of the Chicago Outfit
- Anatol Yusef as Meyer Lansky – a young Jewish gangster who is a protégé of Rothstein's
- Michael Zegen as Benjamin Siegel (seasons 2–3, 5) – Jewish gangster working under childhood friends, Luciano and Lansky
- Ivo Nandi as Joe Masseria (seasons 2–5) – leader of the New York mafia and Luciano and Rosetti's boss
- Kevin O'Rourke as Edward L. Bader (seasons 1–4) – mayor of Atlantic City
- Geoff Pierson as Walter Edge (seasons 1–3) – US Senator who thwarts some of Nucky's plans
- Erik LaRay Harvey as Dunn Purnsley (seasons 2–4) – a Baltimore criminal who works for Chalky White's organization
- Heather Lind as Katy (seasons 2–3) – a servant of Nucky and Margaret's
- Dominic Chianese as Leander Whitlock (seasons 2–4) – the Commodore's long-serving lawyer and eventually an adviser to Jimmy and Gillian
- Julianne Nicholson as Esther Randolph (seasons 2–4) is an Assistant US Attorney prosecuting Nucky for electoral fraud and murder; the character is based on Mabel Walker Willebrandt, a U.S. Assistant Attorney General from 1921 to 1929.
- Peter Van Wagner as Isaac Ginsburg (season 2) – Nucky's lawyer who influences him to take his lawsuit to the federal level
- David Aaron Baker as Bill Fallon (seasons 1–2) – Arnold Rothstein's lawyer
- Stephen Root as Gaston Means (seasons 3–4) – a forger, swindler, and murder suspect who became a special investigator for the United States Department of Justice
- Brian Geraghty as Warren Knox (season 4) – a Federal Bureau of Investigation agent who begins to investigate Nucky
- Stephen DeRosa as Eddie Cantor (seasons 1–4) – a world-famous vaudeville star
- James Cromwell as Andrew W. Mellon (seasons 3–4) – United States Secretary of the Treasury
- Christopher McDonald as Harry M. Daugherty (seasons 1–3) – Attorney General of the United States
- William Forsythe as Manny Horvitz (seasons 2–3) – a Philadelphia gangster
- Erik Weiner as Agent Eric Sebso (season 1) – Van Alden's partner
- William Hill as Alderman George O'Neill (seasons 1–2) – one of Nucky's political cronies
- Robert Clohessy as Alderman Jim Neary (seasons 1–2) – one of Nucky's political cronies
- Max Casella as Leo D'Alessio (season 1) – a small-time Philadelphia gangster
- Edoardo Ballerini as Ignatius D'Alessio (season 1) – Leo's brother and a small-time gangster
- Devin Harjes as Jack Dempsey (season 2) – boxing legend
- Nick Sandow as Waxey Gordon (seasons 2–3) – a Philadelphia gangster and associate of Rothstein's
- Billy Magnussen as Roger McAllister (season 3) – Gillian Darmody's lover
- Meg Chambers Steedle as Lillian "Billie" Kent (season 3) – A New York showgirl and Nucky's mistress
- Eric Ladin as J. Edgar Hoover (season 4) – first director of the Federal Bureau of Investigation.
- Wrenn Schmidt as Julia Sagorsky (seasons 3–4) – Richard Harrow's girlfriend and then wife, and Tommy Darmody's guardian
- Natalie Wachen as Lenore White (seasons 2, 4) – Chalky's wife
- Connor and Brady Noon as Tommy Darmody (seasons 1–4) – Jimmy and Angela's son
- Lucy and Josie Gallina as Emily Schroeder (seasons 1–4) – Margaret's daughter
- Declan and Rory McTigue as Teddy Schroeder (seasons 1–4) – Margaret's son
- Nisi Sturgis as June Thompson – Eli's wife and mother of their eight children
- Chris Caldovino as Tonino Sandrelli (seasons 3–5) – Gyp's right-hand man, works for Joe Masseria
- Adam Mucci as Deputy Halloran (seasons 1–2) – deputy of Atlantic City under Eli Thompson, worked as sheriff for 9 years
- Christiane Seidel as Sigrid Mueller (seasons 2–5) – Nelson Van Alden/George Mueller's wife
- Joseph Aniska as Agent Stan Sawicki (seasons 2–4) – a corrupt Atlantic City prohibition agent paid off by Nucky Thompson
- Glenn Fleshler as George Remus (seasons 2–4) – Ohio bootlegger and associate of Nucky Thompson's
- Margot Bingham as Daughter Maitland (seasons 4–5) – Onyx Club performer and jazz singer
- Peter Claymore as Peter (seasons 1–4) – Arnold Rothstein's personal bodyguard
- Tracy Middendorf as Babette (seasons 1–3) – owner of Babette's Night Club
- Domenick Lombardozzi as Ralph Capone (seasons 4–5) – Chicago mobster and Al Capone's older brother
- Morgan Spector as Frank Capone (season 4) – Al Capone's older brother
- Arron Shiver as Dean O'Banion (seasons 3–4) – Chicago bootlegger and leader of the North Side Gang, rival of Al Capone's
- Mark Borkowski as Paul Sagorsky (seasons 3–4) – alcoholic war veteran and Julia Sagorsky's father
- Emma Holzer as Edith Thompson (seasons 3–4) – Eli and June Thompson's oldest daughter
- Christina Jackson as Maybelle White (seasons 2–4) – Chalky and Lenore White's elder daughter, an aspiring poet
- Patricia Arquette as Sally Wheet (seasons 4–5) – owner of a speakeasy in Tampa, Florida, and of a bar in Cuba
- Joseph Riccobene as Frankie Yale (seasons 1, 3–4) – Brooklyn gangster
- Katherine Waterston as Emma Harrow (seasons 3–4) – Richard Harrow's twin sister
- Will Janowitz as Hymie Weiss (seasons 3–4) – Chicago gangster, and second in command to Dean O'Banion and the North Side gang
- Paul Calderón as Arquimedes (season 5) – Nucky Thompson's personal bodyguard

== Production ==
Season	Episodes	Originally released		Average viewership (in millions)
Season	Episodes	First released	Last released	Average viewership (in millions)
1	12	September 19, 2010	December 5, 2010	3.17
2	12	September 25, 2011	December 11, 2011	2.73
3	12	September 16, 2012	December 2, 2012	2.32
4	12	September 8, 2013	November 24, 2013	2.05
5	8	September 7, 2014	October 26, 2014	2.01

=== Development ===
Emmy Award-winner Terence Winter, who served as executive producer and writer on the HBO series The Sopranos, was hired on June 4, 2008, to adapt the nonfiction book Boardwalk Empire: The Birth, High Times, and Corruption of Atlantic City. Winter had already been interested in creating a series set in the 1920s, feeling that it had never properly been explored before, so he decided to focus his adaptation of the book section about Prohibition. On September 1, 2009, it was announced that Academy Award-winning director Martin Scorsese would direct the pilot. It would be the first time he had directed an episode of television since an episode of Steven Spielberg's Amazing Stories in 1986. The production would be very ambitious, with some even speculating it would be too large scale for television. "I kept thinking, 'This is pointless. How can we possibly afford a boardwalk, or an empire?'" says creator Terence Winter. "We can't call it 'Boardwalk Empire' and not see a boardwalk." The production would eventually build a 300-foot-long (91 m) boardwalk in an empty lot in Brooklyn, New York, at the cost of $5 million. Despite a reported budget of up to $50 million, the pilot's final budget came in at $18 million.

On why he chose to return to television, Scorsese said, "What's happening the past nine to 10 years, particularly at HBO, is what we had hoped for in the mid-'60s with films being made for television at first. We'd hoped there would be this kind of freedom and also the ability to create another world and create long-form characters and story. That didn't happen in the 1970s, 1980s, and in the 1990s, I think. And of course... HBO is a trailblazer in this. I've been tempted over the years to be involved with them because of the nature of long-form and their development of character and plot." He went on to praise HBO by saying, "A number of the episodes, in so many of their series, they're thoughtful, intelligent [and] brilliantly put together... It's a new opportunity for storytelling. It's very different from television of the past."

=== Casting ===
Enoch L. Johnson, upon whom Buscemi's character is based

"Scorsese is an actor magnet," Winter said. "Everybody wants to work with him. I had all these pictures on my wall and I thought, 'I'd really better write some good stuff for these people.'" In casting the role of Nucky Thompson (based upon real-life Atlantic City political boss Enoch L. Johnson), Winter wanted to stray from the real life Johnson as much as possible. "If we were going to cast accurately what the real Nucky looked like, we'd have cast Jim Gandolfini." The idea of casting Steve Buscemi in the lead role came about when Scorsese mentioned wanting to work with the actor, whom Winter knew well having worked with him on The Sopranos. Winter sent the script out to Buscemi, who responded very enthusiastically. "I just thought, 'Wow. I'm almost sorry I've read this, because if I don't get it, I'm going to be so sad.' My response was 'Terry, I know you're looking at other actors'... and he said, 'No, no, Steve, I said we want you.'" Explained Scorsese, "I love the range he has, his dramatic sense, but also his sense of humor."

The casting of Buscemi was soon followed by Michael Pitt, best known for his roles in films such as Murder by Numbers, The Dreamers, and in the television series Dawson's Creek. He was soon joined by Kelly Macdonald, Vincent Piazza and Michael Shannon, who had just received an Oscar nomination for his role in the Sam Mendes film Revolutionary Road.

=== Filming ===
Filming for the pilot took place at various locations in and around New York City in June 2009. In creating the visual effects for the series, the company turned to Brooklyn-based effects company Brainstorm Digital. Says Glenn Allen, visual effects producer for Boardwalk Empire and co-founder of Brainstorm, "It's our most complex job to date. Everything is HD now, so we have to treat it like a feature film." "Anytime you get to work on a period piece, it's more fun," comments visual effects artist Chris "Pinkus" Wesselman, who used archival photographs, postcards, and architectural plans to recreate the Atlantic City boardwalks as accurately as possible. "We got to explore what the old Atlantic City was really like. The piers were one of the toughest parts because every summer they would change—new houses, new advertisements." It took two months for the firm to complete all the visual effects for the pilot. Boardwalk Empire began filming on location at Historic Richmond Town on Staten Island in March 2012. A 300-foot long, 45-foot wide replica of the Atlantic City Boardwalk was constructed in Greenpoint for filming.

=== Costume design ===
Designed by John Dunn and tailored by Martin Greenfield, Boardwalk Empire's costumes were based on 1920s tailoring books from the Fashion Institute of Technology's research libraries and examples found at the Brooklyn Museum and the Met. The costumes have also been rented from the Daybreak Vintage Company located in Albany, NY which also exhibits at the Manhattan Vintage Clothing Show. Dunn's designs were meticulously detailed, including a collar pin for Nucky's shirts and even going so far as to incorporate specially ordered woolens for suiting. Dunn told Esquire magazine in a September 2010 interview, "With Marty and Terry Winters, I developed the feel for each of the characters. We all wanted it to be very, very accurate and specific to the period.... I don't like to do boring clothing, but you also have to make sure that you're not suddenly putting somebody in something that isn't going to make sense four episodes from now." These tailors were supplied by textile importers HMS fabrics and Gladson ltd.

=== Martin Scorsese's contribution ===
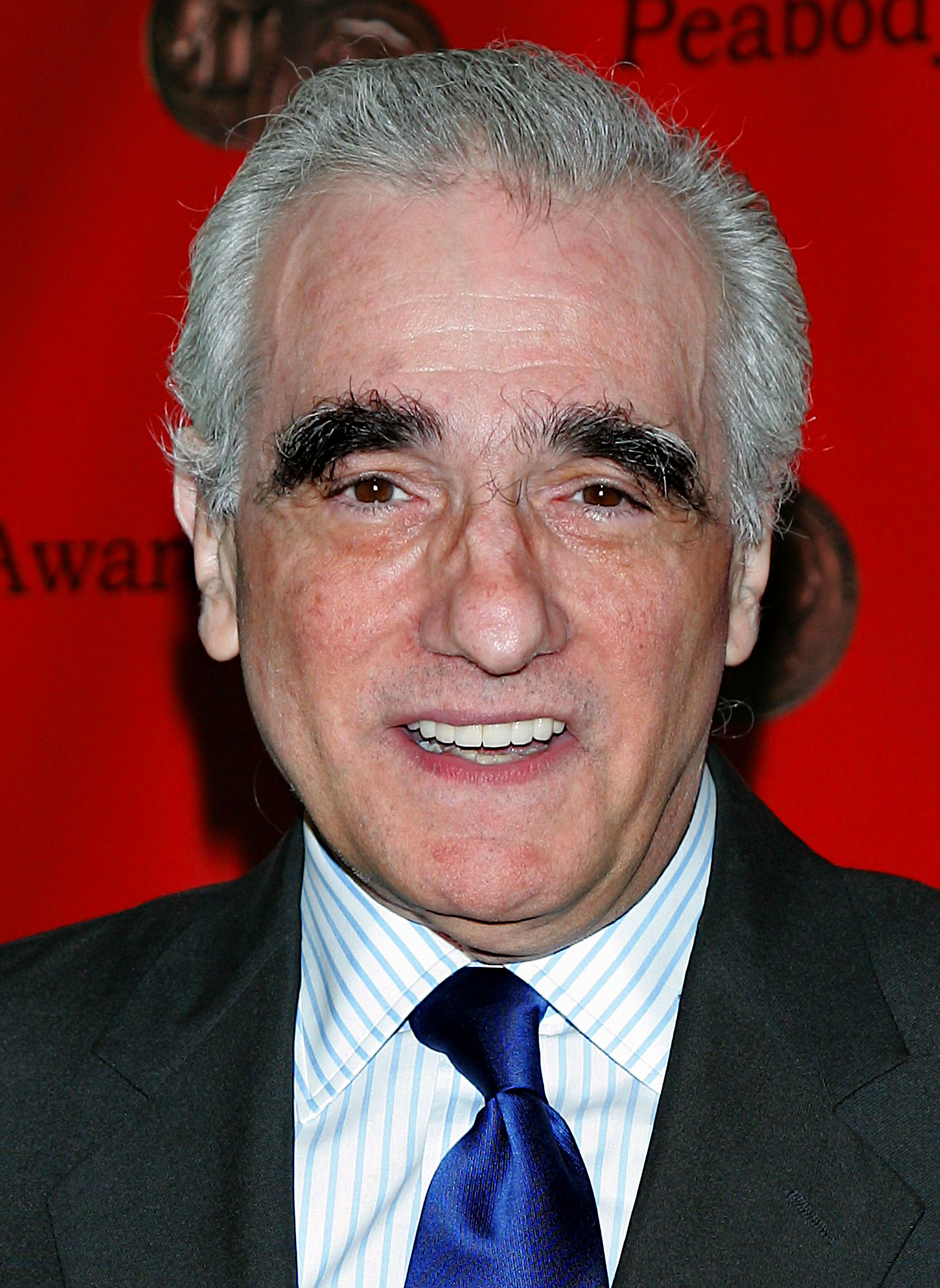
Martin Scorsese (pictured in 2006) directed the pilot.

Martin Scorsese was involved in the filming even before creator Terence Winter. He directed the pilot and established the look of the show, which other directors later emulated for consistency. He is also one of the executive producers of the show. Winter has stated that Scorsese weighed in on the casting decisions and reviewed all of the cuts and dailies. Until the shooting of the show's first season, Scorsese and Winter met every Sunday afternoon to review what went on during the week, where Scorsese would have comments and suggestions. Scorsese continued to be creatively involved in the ongoing production, but did not direct any more episodes.

=== Crew ===
Scorsese and Winter were joined as executive producers by Mark Wahlberg, Stephen Levinson and Tim Van Patten. Van Patten had been a regular director on The Sopranos and also served as a regular director for Boardwalk Empire. Lawrence Konner was a co-executive producer. Konner also wrote for the show and had previously been a writer on The Sopranos. Howard Korder and Margaret Nagle served as supervising producers and writers for the first season. Canadian screenwriter and showrunner Chris Haddock also joined the writing staff. The crew were recognized with multiple Primetime Emmy Award nominations for their work on the first season. Korder returned as a co-executive producer and writer for the show's second season and as an executive producer in the third season.

=== Soundtrack ===
The music used for the opening titles is "Straight Up and Down" by The Brian Jonestown Massacre. It was chosen by series creator Winter to create a sense of the "unexpected".

The soundtrack is composed of music from the 1890s to 1920s performed by artists such as Regina Spektor, Leon Redbone, Loudon Wainwright III, Martha Wainwright, Catherine Russell, Nellie McKay, Kathy Brier, and Vince Giordano and the Nighthawks Orchestra. Boardwalk Empire Volume 1: Music from the HBO Original Series, featuring music from seasons 1 and 2, was released on September 13, 2011.

The soundtrack won the Grammy Award for Best Compilation Soundtrack for Visual Media at the 54th Grammy Awards.

== Advertising ==
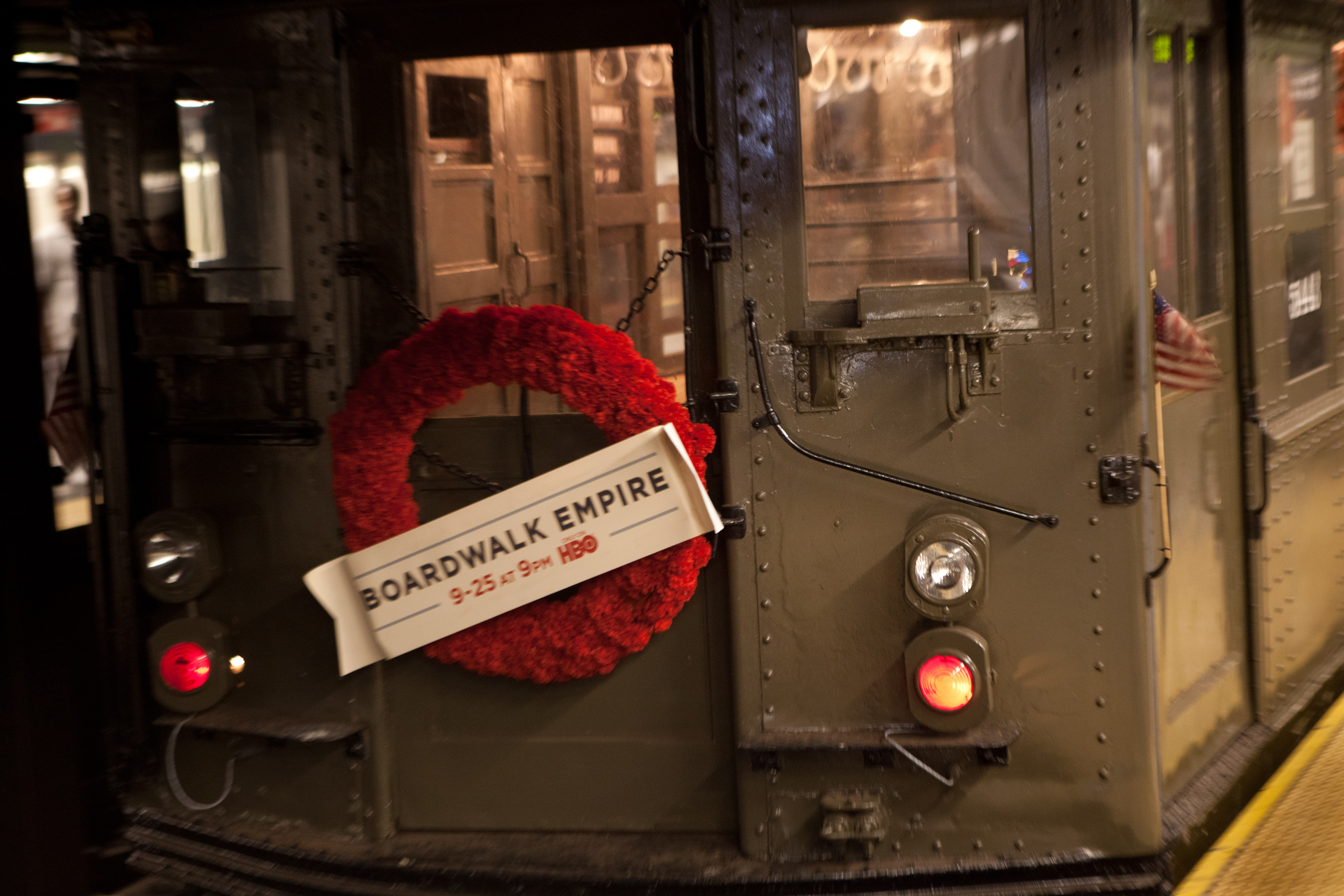
IRT LoV car 5443 advertising Boardwalk Empire's second season

To promote the second season, which started on September 25, 2011, the producers paid the Metropolitan Transportation Authority $150,000 to decorate and operate a New York Transit Museum train of four retired New York City Subway Lo-V cars for each weekend in September 2011. The two pairs of subway cars used were 5290 & 5292 (both built in 1917) and 5443 and 5483 (both built in 1924). The train operated between noon and 6 pm, and as an express between 96th Street and Times Square–42nd Street Subway on the IRT Broadway–Seventh Avenue Line. While the MTA runs "nostalgia trains" each year, this was the first time they had been used for an advertising tie-in.

HBO also sponsored an Atlantic City beautification project with the tag line "Compliments of Nucky Thompson" and paid for eastbound tolls into Atlantic City on the AC Expressway for the weekend of September 24, 2011.

== Reception ==
=== Critical reception ===
Critical response of Boardwalk Empire
Season	Rotten Tomatoes	Metacritic
1	94% (67 reviews)	88 (31 reviews)
2	91% (34 reviews)	82 (14 reviews)
3	89% (45 reviews)	76 (15 reviews)
4	98% (43 reviews)	77 (13 reviews)
5	88% (132 reviews)	83 (12 reviews)

Boardwalk Empire has received critical acclaim. For its first and second seasons, the American Film Institute named Boardwalk Empire one of the 10 "best television programs of the year".

On the review aggregator website Metacritic, the first season scored 88 out of 100, and the second season scored 82 out of 100, both indicating "universal acclaim". The third season scored 76, and the fourth season scored 77 out of 100, both indicating "generally favorable reviews". The show's fifth and final season scored 83 out of 100.

On another review aggregator site, Rotten Tomatoes, the first season received a rating of 94%. Season two received a 91%, the third season an 89%, and the fourth season a 98%, stating "Boardwalk Empire continues to benefit from its meticulously realized period trappings, but what keeps the show watchable is its supremely talented ensemble players". The fifth season of the show holds a rating of 88%, with the site's consensus reading: "The final season of Boardwalk Empire is as visually dazzling and well-acted as ever, but it's the emphasis on Nucky Thompson's history that's particularly rewarding this time out."

David Hinkley of the New York Daily News awarded the series five stars, saying, "Watching HBO's new 'Boardwalk Empire' is like sitting in your favorite tavern and hearing someone say, 'Drinks are on the house.' Friends, it does not get much better." Paige Wiser of the Chicago Sun-Times called it "... an event not to be missed," and praised Buscemi in particular, calling his performance "fascinating".

TV Guide's Matt Roush praised the partnership of Scorsese and Winter, saying it "... brilliantly marries Martin Scorsese's virtuosic cinematic eye to Terence Winter's panoramic mastery of rich character and eventful story," and finished his review by stating, "It's the most purely—and impurely—enjoyable storytelling HBO has delivered in ages, like a movie that you never want to end."

Variety's Brian Lowry praised the show for returning network HBO to top form, saying, "This is, quite simply, television at its finest, occupying a sweet spot that—for all the able competition—still remains unique to HBO: An expensive, explicit, character-driven program, tackling material no broadcast network or movie studio would dare touch ... For those wondering when the channel would deliver another franchise to definitively put it on top of the world, Ma, the wait is over: Go directly to Boardwalk."

"One of the unexpected joys of Boardwalk Empire, though, lies in the way the show revels in the oddities of its time, peeling back the layers of polite society to reveal a giddy shadow world of criminals and politicians collaborating to keep the liquor flowing," says online magazine Salon's Heather Havrilesky, who went on to call the pilot "breathtaking". Roberto Bianco from USA Today said in his review that Boardwalk Empire was "Extravagantly produced, shockingly violent and as cold and hard as ice, Boardwalk Empire brings us back to the world's former playground at the start of Prohibition—and brings HBO back to the forefront of the TV-series race."

The second season received widespread acclaim. Verne Gay from Newsday stated that "Mad Men, of course, remains the King of the Emmys, while Empire nailed the equally prestigious Golden Globe for best drama last winter. But Sunday begins to build the case for Empire, and build it convincingly." Matt Roush of TV Guide stated, "This is a gorgeous piece of storytelling that requires and rewards patience." Brian Lowry stated in his review for Variety that: "A few creative flourishes feel a trifle heavy-handed – starting with Shannon's philandering fed. Unlike Nucky, though, Boardwalk isn't campaigning for anything except the gratitude of a pay-cable audience (and award voters) eager to take refuge in its sordid charms. By that measure, the show doesn't just go down smoothly; it's good to the last illicit, intoxicating drop."

Nancy Franklin of The New Yorker considered Buscemi miscast as the central figure in the drama. "Buscemi can't play that kind of character; even at the age of fifty-two, he looks cagey and restless—not like a guy at the top but like the guy who gets killed when he tries to knock off the guy at the top." The review concludes "Boardwalk Empire is at great pains to give viewers a sense that they are there, and yet rarely did I feel engrossed in the show. Even if its point is to show you the ugly side of fun, Boardwalk Empire should be much more fun to watch."

Alessandra Stanley of The New York Times review states that "surprisingly, given the extraordinary talent and money behind it, Boardwalk Empire falls short. One possible reason is that the star, Steve Buscemi, is hard to accept in the lead role of Enoch Thompson," going on to observe "it takes a lot of squinting to see him as a powerbroker straddling two worlds."

=== Awards and nominations ===
On July 14, 2011, for the 63rd Primetime Emmy Awards, Boardwalk Empire was nominated for 18 Primetime Emmy Awards for the first season that included Outstanding Drama Series, Outstanding Lead Actor in a Drama Series (Steve Buscemi), and Outstanding Supporting Actress in a Drama Series (Kelly Macdonald), with Martin Scorsese winning Outstanding Directing for a Drama Series, along with seven other wins at the Creative Arts Emmy Awards. Boardwalk Empire won the Writers Guild of America Award for Best New Series and was nominated for Best Dramatic Series. In addition, the show won the Golden Globe Award for Best Television Series – Drama and Steve Buscemi won Best Actor – Television Series Drama, while Kelly Macdonald was nominated for Best Supporting Actress – Series, Miniseries, or Television Film. The cast won the Screen Actors Guild Award for Outstanding Performance by an Ensemble in a Drama Series in 2011 and 2012, while Steve Buscemi won for Outstanding Performance by a Male Actor in a Drama Series as well in 2011 and 2012, for the first and second season. In 2011, Martin Scorsese won the Directors Guild of America Award for Outstanding Directing – Drama Series for the pilot. Boardwalk Empire was also listed in the American Film Institute's Top Ten List for Television in 2010 and 2011 for the first and second season.

Boardwalk Empire also won two awards at the 9th Annual Visual Effects Society Awards. The first for Outstanding Supporting Visual Effects in a Broadcast Program and second for Outstanding Models & Miniatures in a Broadcast Program or Commercial. The former was received by Richard Friedlander (of Brainstorm Digital), Robert Stromberg, Paul Graff and David Taritero; the latter was received by Brendan Fitzgerald, John Corbett and Matthew Conner of Brainstorm Digital. The show's Season One Soundtrack won the Grammy Award for Best Compilation Soundtrack for Visual Media in 2012.

For the second season, Boardwalk Empire won once again for the Primetime Emmy Award for Outstanding Directing for a Drama Series for Tim Van Patten for the season finale "To the Lost", along with three other wins at the Creative Arts Emmy Awards.

For the third season, Bobby Cannavale won the show's first acting award at the 65th Primetime Emmy Awards for Outstanding Supporting Actor in a Drama Series for his portrayal of Gyp Rosetti, along with four other wins at the Creative Arts Emmy Awards.

=== Ratings ===
On its original airing, the pilot episode gained a 2.0/5 ratings share among adults aged 18–49 and garnered 4.81 million viewers. The episode was re-played twice that night, once at 10:15 p.m. and again at 11:30 p.m. Taking these broadcasts into account, a total of 7.1 million Americans viewed the episode on the night of its original broadcast, and is the highest rated premiere for an HBO series since the pilot of Deadwood in March 2004. The season finale was watched by 3.29 million viewers, attaining a 1.3 rating adults aged 18–49.

The second-season premiere was watched by 2.91 million viewers, down 39% from the pilot and down 12% from its first-season finale.

Boardwalk Empire : U.S. viewers per episode (millions)

Season	Episode number											
Season	1	2	3	4	5	6	7	8	9	10	11	12
1	4.81	3.33	3.41	2.57	2.85	2.81	2.67	3.21	2.98	3.05	3.00	3.29
2	2.91	2.59	2.86	2.55	2.69	2.63	2.74	2.54	2.55	2.73	2.97	3.01
3	2.89	2.62	2.36	2.11	2.19	2.34	1.97	2.09	2.06	2.18	2.30	2.73
4	2.38	2.21	1.87	1.99	2.09	1.90	2.16	1.91	1.90	2.08	1.98	2.18
5	2.37	1.81	2.11	2.05	1.94	1.55	1.95	2.33	–			

Audience measurement performed by Nielsen Media Research

== See also ==
- List of Primetime Emmy Awards received by HBO
