= Sisters of St. John the Baptist =

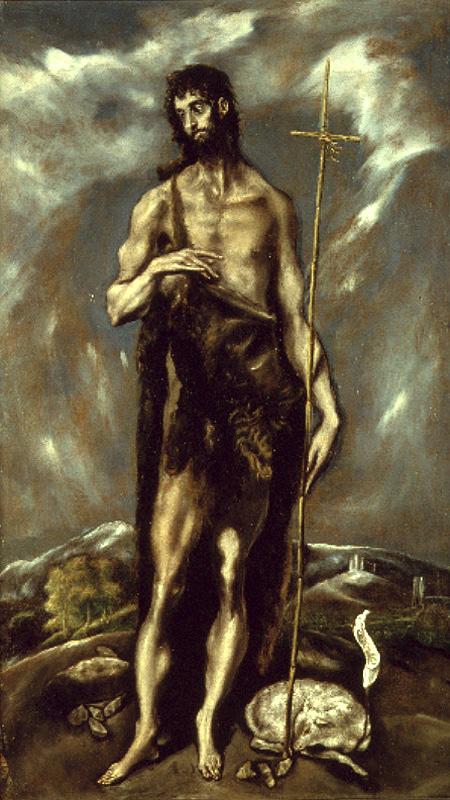

The Sisters of St. John the Baptist (Baptistines) are a Roman Catholic female religious institute, founded in Angri, Italy in 1878, by Alfonso Maria Fusco.

== History ==
Shortly before he was ordained in 1863, Alfonso Maria Fusco dreamt that he was called to found an orphanage and a new religious community of women to staff it. He was assigned to Angri, where the parish church was dedicated to Saint John the Baptist. There, he met Maddalena Caputo, who was interested in entering religious life. In September 1878, Caputo and three others became the first Sisters of St. John the Baptist of the Nazarene. They converted a dilapidated house into the Little House of Providence to shelter orphans, who were given an education, and the older ones taught a trade. Caputo, now known as Sister Crocifissa, became the first superior of the institute.

The congregation received final approval from the Holy See in 1927.

== Expansion ==
Growing requests for assistance led to the establishment of other houses in Campania and elsewhere throughout Italy.

In 1922, the sisters opened St. John Villa Academy on Staten Island. Due to declining enrollment, and growing maintenance expenses of an aging facility the Academy closed in June 2018. The City of New York bought the campus for use as a public school.

The sisters came to Canada in 1962 and operate Infant Jesus Daycare centres in Hamilton and Waterdown.

The congregation sent its first members to India, who arrived at Madurai, Tamil Nadu, in 1977. Its provincial house is in Bangalore. The sisters in Zambia operate a number of schools.

== Present day ==
The Sisters serve in about seventeen countries on five continents. The generalate of the Congregation is located in Rome, Italy. As of 2021, there were 700 members of the congregation.
