= Ralph Capone =

Italian-American Chicago mobster (1894–1974)

- Born: Raffaele James Capone; January 12, 1894; Angri, Campania, Kingdom of Italy
- Died: November 22, 1974 (aged 80); Hurley, Wisconsin, U.S.
- Resting place: Mount Carmel Cemetery, Hillside, Illinois, U.S.
- Other name: Bottles
- Citizenship: American
- Occupation: Mobster
- Spouses: Florence Muscato (m. 1915; div. 1921) Velma Pheasant (m. 1923; div. 1938) Madeline Capone (m. 1951)
- Children: 1
- Relatives: Al Capone (brother); James Vincenzo Capone (brother); Frank Capone (brother)
- Allegiance: Chicago Outfit

Ralph James Capone (/kəˈpoʊn/ kə-POHN; born Raffaele James Capone, Italian: [raffaˈɛːle kaˈpoːne]; January 12, 1894 – November 22, 1974) was an Italian-American mobster and an older brother of Al Capone and Frank Capone. He got the nickname "Bottles" not from involvement in the Capone bootlegging empire, but from his running the legitimate non-alcoholic beverage and bottling operations in Chicago. Further family lore suggests that the nickname was specifically tied to his lobbying the Illinois legislature to put into law that milk bottling companies had to stamp the date that the milk was bottled on the bottle. He was most famous for being named by the Chicago Crime Commission "Public Enemy Number Three" when his brother Al was "Public Enemy Number One".

== Early life ==
Capone was born in 1894, in Angri, a small town in Campania, Italy, near Mount Vesuvius, and he was the middle son of Gabriele and Teresa (née Raiola) Capone. He had eight siblings, Vicenzo, Frank, Al, Ermina, John, Matthew and Mafalda Capone. He arrived in the United States on a ship named Werra on June 18, 1895 with his older brother Vincenzo and mother Theresa, entering via Ellis Island. His father had come to the United States by the way of Canada, six months previously. They settled in Brooklyn, living near the Navy yards.

On September 24, 1915, at the age of 21, he married Filomena (Florence) Muscato, age 17. They had a son, Ralph Gabriel Capone in 1917.

== Life in Chicago ==
After the death of his father Gabriel in November 1920, Ralph was brought to Chicago by his younger brother, Al. His wife didn't want to move so Ralph took Ralph Jr. to Chicago where he was raised by his mother as her youngest child. Ralph Sr. returned to New York in 1921 and got a divorce decree from Florence on the charge of abandonment.

In 1923, he married for the second time to Velma Pheasant. They had no children and divorced in March 1938.

Capone was placed in charge of the Chicago Outfit's bottling plants during Prohibition. The Outfit was attempting to monopolize non-alcoholic beverages and soft drinks (specifically ginger ale and soda water, commonly used in mixed drinks) during this period when the sale of alcohol was banned. Ralph Capone made large profits for the Outfit and became the dominant soft drink vendor other than Coca-Cola during the 1933 World's Fair. In April 1930, the elder Capone was included in Frank J. Loesch's Chicago Crime Commission "Public Enemies" list. He was Public Enemy #3, while his brother Al was Public Enemy #1.

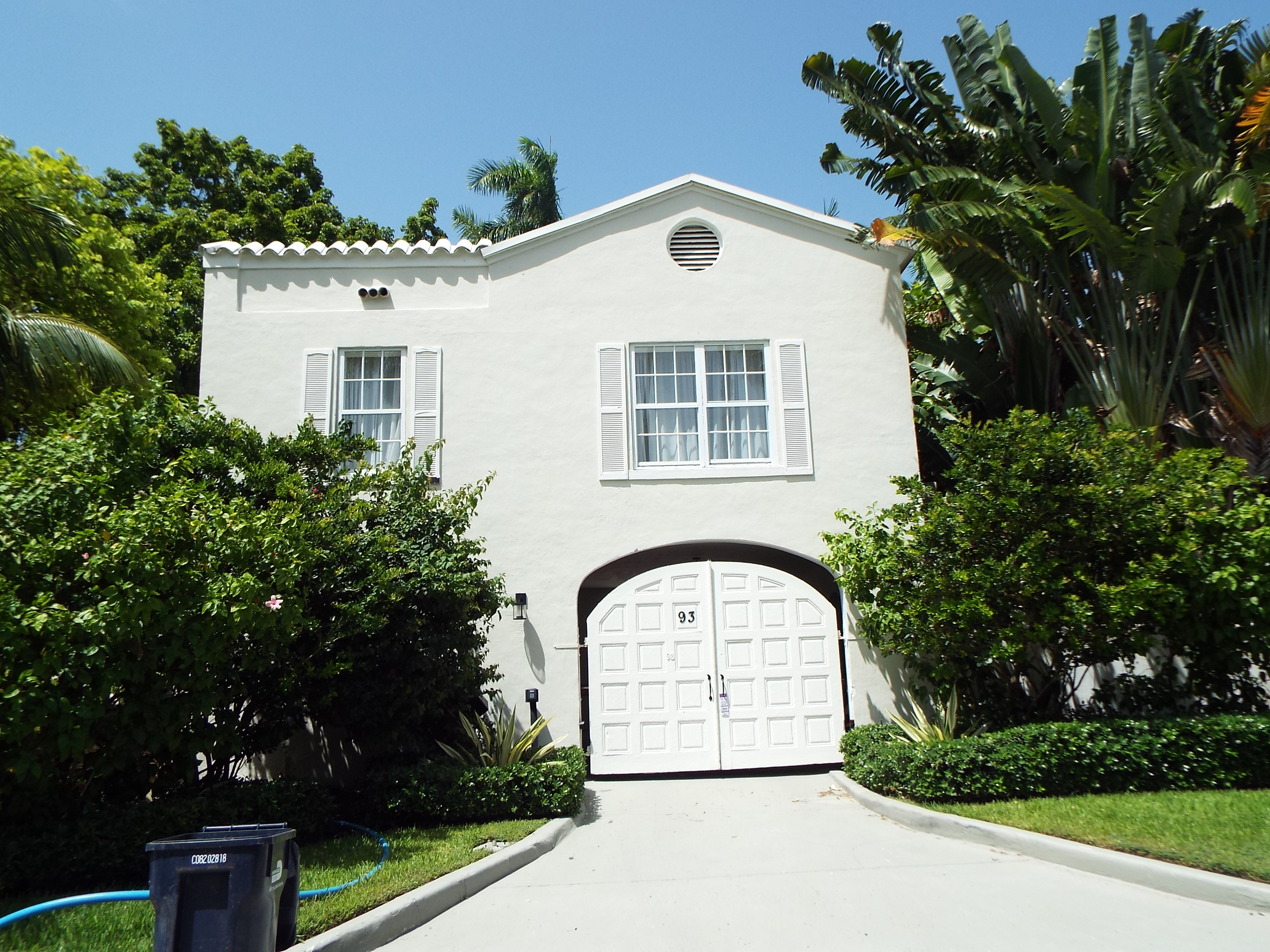
The entrance of Al Capone's mansion where Ralph Capone hosted several high-level Outfit conferences. The mansion was located at 93 Palm Ave. in Miami, Florida.

Following Al Capone's conviction for tax evasion in 1931, Ralph Capone remained with the Outfit. He hosted several meetings of The Commission at his brother's residence in Palm Island, Florida. As the manager of Chicago's Cotton Club, Capone was reportedly involved in illegal gambling and prostitution. In 1932, he was also convicted of tax evasion and served three years.

In 1950, the United Press described Capone as "…in his own right… one of the overlords of the national syndicate which controls gambling, vice, and other rackets". Whether still he was a real boss is a matter of dispute and some of the evidence heard by the U.S. Senate Kefauver Committee suggested otherwise. However in 1935 notorious West Side gangster Louis Alterie was forced to testify against Ralph on a tax evasion charge and a few weeks later was shot dead. In the 1930s, Capone purchased a home and later managed a hotel/tavern in Mercer, Wisconsin. The hotel was named "The Rex Hotel" and the tavern was named, "Billy's Bar". After Capone's release from prison, he moved to Wisconsin and lived there until his death.

== Death ==
On November 22, 1974, Capone died of natural causes in Hurley, Wisconsin. He was cremated at Park Hill Cemetery in Duluth, Minnesota. His ashes were buried at the Capone Family grave site by his granddaughter Deirdre in June 2008. He was survived by his wife Madeline, whom he had married in 1951.

== In popular culture ==
Ralph Capone was portrayed by

- Ed O'Ross, in the 1987 film The Verne Miller Story
- Titus Welliver in the 1990 television movie The Lost Capone
- Domenick Lombardozzi in the HBO series Boardwalk Empire
- Al Sapienza in the 2020 film Capone.
