= War Memorial (Angri) =

Coordinates: 40°44′18″N 14°34′21″E

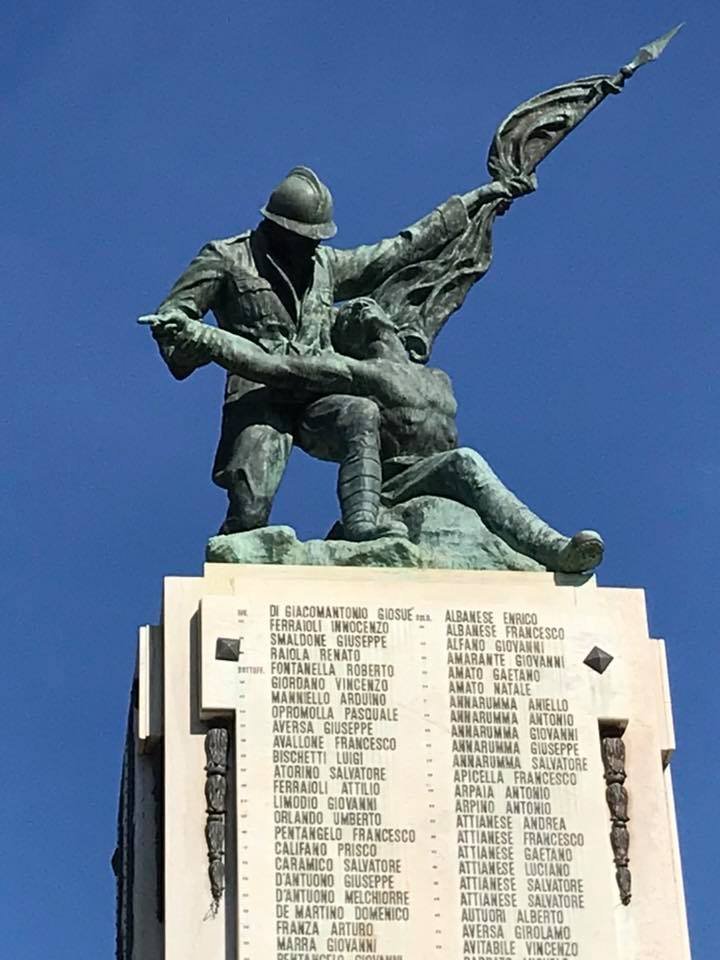
Detail of the Italian soldier holding his dying comrade and the Italian state flag

The Monument to the Fallen of Angri is a public monument located in Piazza Doria, in the center of the town of Angri, Italy, dedicated to the fallen of the First and Second world wars—an allegory of the sacrifice of the soldier for the homeland.

== History ==
It was built from a project by the engineer Paolo Caiazzo and Mr. Marcellini starting in 1924. The initial project did not include the bronze sculpture group of the Winged Victory located at the base. The monument was inaugurated by Marshal Pietro Badoglio of Italy on 11 February 1940 and initially bore the names of the 150 fallen in the Turkish war and the First World War. On the monument there was a dedicatory plaque drawn up by Professor Carlo La Mura which read "here as children we dreamed of a serene life; but we threw it into the whirlwind of war, certain of your memory, oh fellow citizens of Angri." This inscription was later covered with the marble slab which bears the names of the 235 fallen from Angri in the Second World War.

== Description ==
The monument consists of a flight of five steps, on which rests a bronze relief, depicting two helmets, two swords, two rifles and oak branches. The statue of the winged Victory, covered by a peplos that leaves one breast uncovered, rests one foot on the last step and has an arm stretched forward carrying the hilt of a sword in her hand. Large blocks of stone are assembled to form three levels on which rests a marble base. On the four sides are placed the lists of the fallen. At the top, a bronze sculptural group depicts an infantryman raising a collected flag and supporting a dying comrade.

== See also ==
- Angri
- Marshal of Italy
- Marshal Pietro Badoglio
- Turkish invasion of Armenia
- War memorial
- World War I
- World War II

== Bibliography ==
=== Historical sources ===
- Gennaro Zurolo (December 2008). "I CADUTI DI ANGRI, Appendice" [THE FALLEN OF ANGRI, Appendix]. In Municipality of Angri (ed.). Le strade di Angri, la toponomastica, i personaggi, le storie [The streets of Angri, the toponymy, the characters, the stories] (Paperback) (in Italian). Foreword by Dr. Mayor Giampaolo Mazzola. Angri (SA): ANGRI MUNICIPALITY EDITION 2008. pp. 364, 365, 366 and 367.
- Giuseppe Barbella (March 2025). Uomini, soldati, eroi, vittime: angresi, racconti di un passato che non dobbiamo dimenticare [Men, soldiers, heroes, victims: Angresi, stories of a past that we must not forget] (Paperback) (in Italian). Illustrated by A.I. Lesmo (MB): Wood & Stein Editore. ISBN 9788890539640.
