= Richard James Hart =

American sharpshooter and prohibition agent (1892–1952)

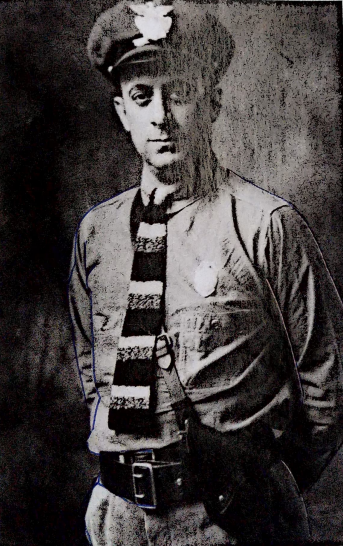
- Born: James Vincenzo Capone; March 28, 1892; Angri, Campania, Kingdom of Italy
- Died: October 1, 1952 (aged 60); Homer, Nebraska, U.S.
- Resting place: Omaha Valley Cemetery; Homer, Nebraska, U.S.
- Other name: Two-Gun Hart
- Citizenship: American
- Occupation: Sharpshooter
- Organization: Bureau of Indian Affairs
- Spouse: Kathleen Winch (m. 1919)
- Children: 4
- Relatives: Al Capone (brother); Frank Capone (brother); Ralph Capone (brother)

Richard James "Two-Gun" Hart (born James Vincenzo Capone, Italian: [vinˈtʃɛntso kaˈpoːne]; March 28, 1892 – October 1, 1952) was an Italian-American sharpshooter and prohibition agent, who was noted for his cowboy style and for being the elder brother of gangsters Al, Frank, and Ralph Capone.

== Early life ==
Capone was born in 1892, in Angri, Province of Salerno, Italy. He was the first of the nine children of Gabriele Capone, a barber, and Teresa Raiola, a seamstress. In 1894, his parents emigrated to the United States with their children, James and Ralph, settling in downtown Brooklyn. During his early years in America his siblings Frank, Al, Ermina, John, Albert, Matthew and Mafalda Capone (later Maritote) were born.

== Career ==
Capone left home at age 16, then left New York City, joined a circus as a roustabout and eventually adopted the last name of his idol, William S. Hart, the foremost star of Western silent films in the 1920s. He also adopted the actor's persona as much as possible, "even earning the 'Two-Gun' moniker long attached to the motion picture star".

He worked to lose his Brooklyn accent and tried to disguise his Italian ancestry. According to some accounts he enlisted in the United States Army during World War I, served in France, and earned a commission as a lieutenant. Other sources say that he claimed to have served in France during the war, but was much later expelled from his local American Legion organization of war veterans after it was found that the Department of the Army had no record of his war service.

After the war, Capone legally changed his name to Richard James Hart. He married Kathleen Winch in 1919, and they had four sons, Richard, William, Sherman, and Harry Hart. He became a federal prohibition agent, making his home in Homer, Nebraska. Following a series of successful raids against bootleggers, he gained the nickname of "Two-Gun" Hart.

In 1926, Hart became a special agent of the Bureau of Indian Affairs. He was assigned to the Cheyenne River Indian reservation in South Dakota. While there he once had the duty of protecting President Calvin Coolidge and his family on their visit to the Black Hills. He was later transferred to the Spokane Indian Reservation in Washington. He was credited with the arrest of at least 20 wanted killers while in that area, besides pursuing Indian lawbreakers and hunting down moonshiners and destroying their stills. He spent some time as a law enforcement officer on the Coeur d'Alene Reservation in Plummer, Idaho.

He learned of his siblings' life of crime from newspapers when their exploits became national news.

== Later years ==
Hart returned to Homer as a prohibition agent in 1931. He was employed as a special agent for the Bureau of Indian Affairs, in which capacity he sought out illegal alcohol on Indian reservations, until he was convicted of manslaughter for killing a wanted man who did not surrender. With the repealing of Prohibition two years later, he became a marshal and then a justice of the peace. During the Great Depression he was dismissed as marshal and justice of the peace after he was caught shoplifting from a grocery store, and was also dismissed from the American Legion when no records of his army service were found.

In the late 1930s, Hart asked his brother Ralph for help; Hart, Ralph, and Al had a reunion at Ralph's house when Al was released from prison in 1939. Ralph Capone was tried for tax evasion in 1951, and Hart testified during the trial, revealing his identity as James Vincenzo Capone, causing a newspaper sensation, although his identity had already been revealed during family visits decades before.

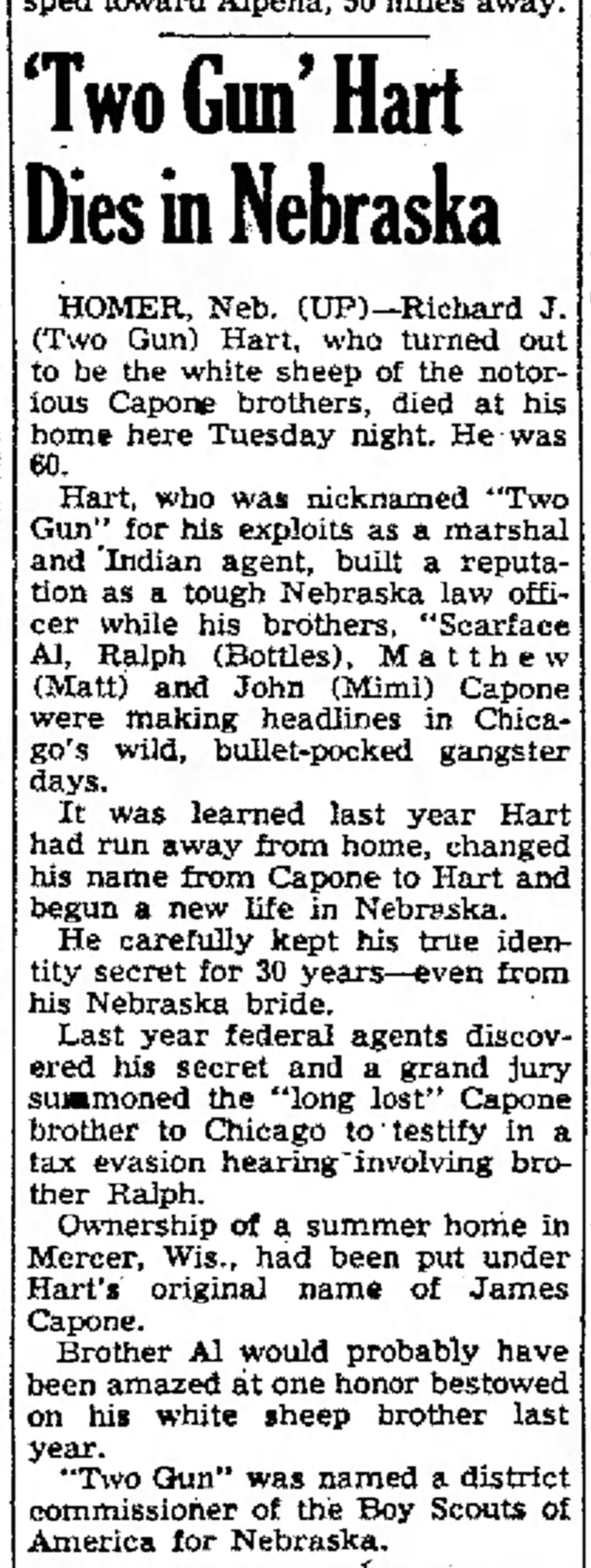
Hart's death announced in a local newspaper

Hart was subpoenaed to appear before a grand jury in Chicago. At this time he suffered from diabetes and walked with a cane. Shortly after testifying he died in Homer, Nebraska, in 1952, of a heart attack at the age of 60. He was buried in the Omaha Valley Cemetery in Homer.

== In popular culture ==
Hart's life and career were fictionalized in the 1990 TNT TV-movie The Lost Capone, in which he is portrayed by Adrian Pasdar.

In 2017, Hart was dramatized in the science fiction television drama Timeless. In the fifteenth episode "Public Enemy No. 1", Hart was enlisted by the protagonists to help defeat Capone. In the episode, Hart is depicted as living in Chicago. Hart was portrayed by Mather Zickel.
