= Homer, Nebraska =

Villages in Dakota County, Nebraska, United States

- Village
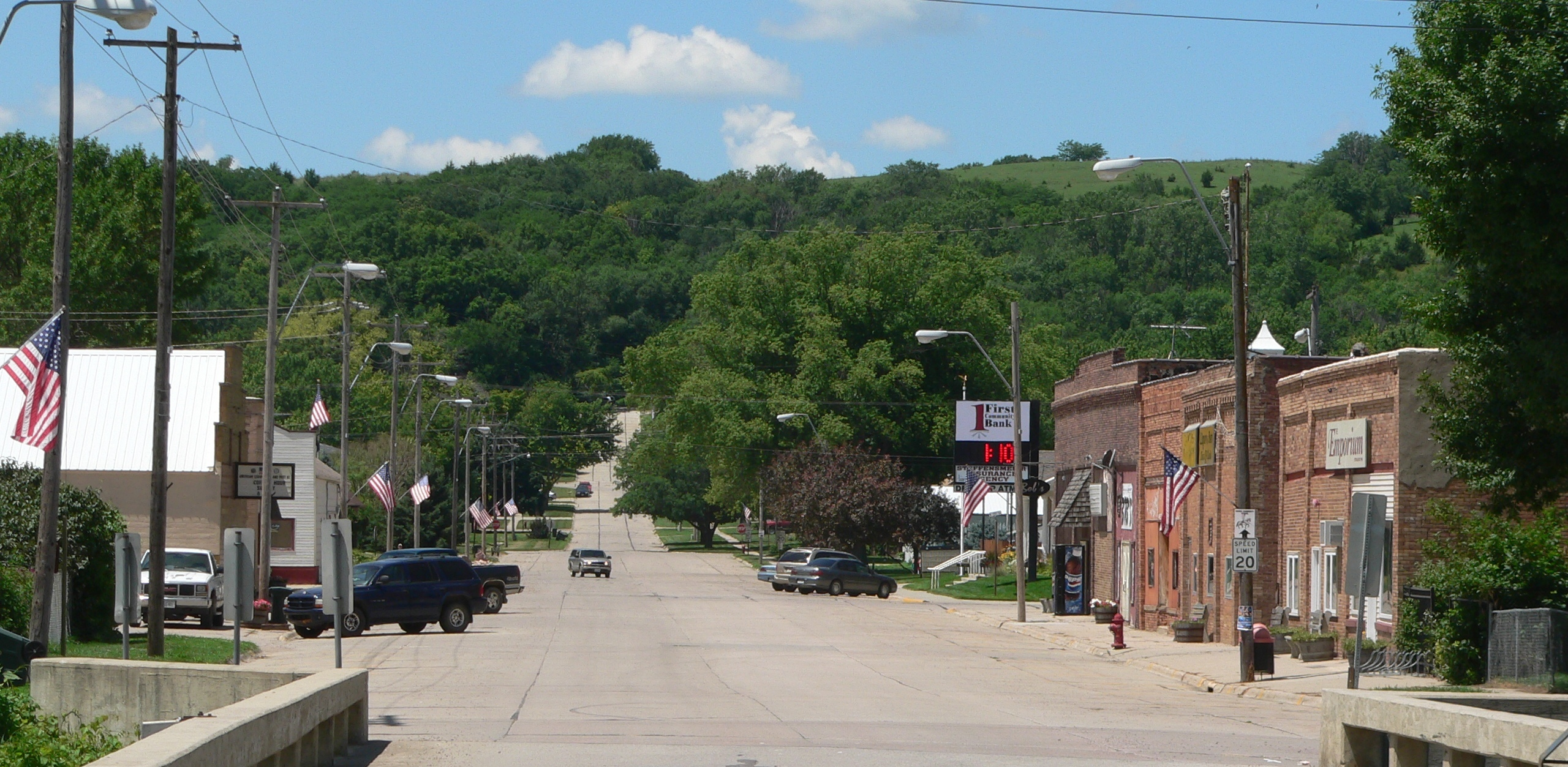
- John Street in Homer, July 2010
- Motto: "Little But Lively"
- Location of Homer, Nebraska
- Coordinates: 42°19′21″N 96°29′28″W
- Country: United States
- State: Nebraska
- County: Dakota

Area
  - Total: 0.37 sq mi (0.96 km^{2})
  - Land: 0.37 sq mi (0.96 km^{2})
  - Water: 0 sq mi (0.00 km^{2})
- Elevation: 1,109 ft (338 m)

Population (2020)
  - Total: 532
  - Density: 1,436.7/sq mi (554.72/km^{2})
- Time zone: UTC-6 (Central (CST))
  - Summer (DST): UTC-5 (CDT)
- ZIP code: 68030
- Area code: 402
- FIPS code: 31-22920
- GNIS feature ID: 2398534
- Website: homer.municipalimpact.com

Homer is a village in Dakota County, Nebraska, United States. It is part of the Sioux City, IA–NE–SD Metropolitan Statistical Area. As of the 2020 census, Homer had a population of 532.

== History ==
Homer was platted in 1874. It was named for the Greek poet Homer.

== Geography ==
According to the United States Census Bureau, the village has a total area of 0.37 square miles (0.96 km^{2}), all land.

== Demographics ==
Historical population
Census	Pop.	Note	%±
1890	251		—
1900	341		35.9%
1910	397		16.4%
1920	491		23.7%
1930	452		−7.9%
1940	477		5.5%
1950	345		−27.7%
1960	370		7.2%
1970	457		23.5%
1980	564		23.4%
1990	553		−2.0%
2000	590		6.7%
2010	549		−6.9%
2020	532		−3.1%
U.S. Decennial Census

=== 2010 census ===
As of the census of 2010, there were 549 people, 213 households, and 154 families residing in the village. The population density was 1,483.8 inhabitants per square mile (572.9/km^{2}). There were 228 housing units at an average density of 616.2 per square mile (237.9/km^{2}). The racial makeup of the village was 92.5% White, 5.3% Native American, 0.2% from other races, and 2.0% from two or more races. Hispanic or Latino of any race were 0.9% of the population.

There were 213 households, of which 42.3% had children under the age of 18 living with them, 52.1% were married couples living together, 14.1% had a female householder with no husband present, 6.1% had a male householder with no wife present, and 27.7% were non-families. 25.8% of all households were made up of individuals, and 13.6% had someone living alone who was 65 years of age or older. The average household size was 2.58 and the average family size was 3.08.

The median age in the village was 36.8 years. 29% of residents were under the age of 18; 8.8% were between the ages of 18 and 24; 24% were from 25 to 44; 23.4% were from 45 to 64; and 14.9% were 65 years of age or older. The gender makeup of the village was 46.3% male and 53.7% female.

=== 2000 census ===
As of the census of 2000, there were 590 people, 211 households, and 163 families residing in the village. The population density was 1,561.5 inhabitants per square mile (602.9/km^{2}). There were 222 housing units at an average density of 587.5 per square mile (226.8/km^{2}). The racial makeup of the village was 96.95% White, 2.88% Native American, and 0.17% from two or more races. Hispanic or Latino of any race were 0.34% of the population.

There were 211 households, out of which 38.9% had children under the age of 18 living with them, 60.7% were married couples living together, 12.8% had a female householder with no husband present, and 22.7% were non-families. 18.5% of all households were made up of individuals, and 8.5% had someone living alone who was 65 years of age or older. The average household size was 2.80 and the average family size was 3.10.

In the village, the population was spread out, with 33.2% under the age of 18, 7.3% from 18 to 24, 27.5% from 25 to 44, 20.5% from 45 to 64, and 11.5% who were 65 years of age or older. The median age was 33 years. For every 100 females, there were 99.3 males. For every 100 females age 18 and over, there were 93.1 males.

As of 2000 the median income for a household in the village was $44,500, and the median income for a family was $51,250. Males had a median income of $37,667 versus $22,426 for females. The per capita income for the village was $17,361. About 6.2% of families and 8.2% of the population were below the poverty line, including 14.2% of those under age 18 and 2.7% of those age 65 or over.

== Notable people ==
- James Vincenzo Capone, Prohibition marshal and oldest brother of Al Capone.
- Alvin Saunders Johnson, co-founder and first director of The New School in New York, inducted into the Nebraska Hall of Fame in 2012.

== See also ==
- List of municipalities in Nebraska
