= Alfonso Maria Fusco =

Italian Roman Catholic saint (1839–1910)

Saint Alfonso Maria Fusco
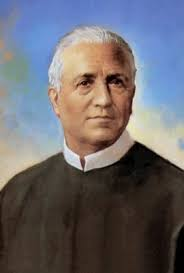
- Born: 23 March 1839; Angri, Salerno, Kingdom of the Two Sicilies
- Died: 6 February 1910 (aged 70); Angri, Salerno, Kingdom of Italy
- Venerated in: Roman Catholic Church
- Beatified: 7 October 2001, Saint Peter's Square by Pope John Paul II
- Canonized: 16 October 2016, Saint Peter's Square by Pope Francis
- Feast: 6 February

Alfonso Maria Fusco (23 March 1839 – 6 February 1910) was a Roman Catholic priest and the founder of the Sisters of Saint John the Baptist – also known as the Baptistine Sisters. Their mission was to evangelize and educate as well as to promote the faith amongst adolescents with a particular emphasis on those who were poor or abandoned.

He received beatification from Pope John Paul II in 2001 and Pope Francis approved his canonization on 26 April 2016 – a date was determined on 20 June 2016 for sainthood and it was celebrated on 16 October 2016.

== Life ==
Alfonso Maria Fusco was born as the first of five children to Aniello Fusco (a farmer) and Giuseppina Schianova at Angri in Salerno on 23 March 1839; his parents married on 31 January 1834. Alfonso's birth was attributed to the intercession of Alphonsus de Ligouri whose tomb the couple had visited. A Redemptorist priest named Saverio Pecorelli assured them that: "You will have a son; you will name him Alfonso; he will become a priest and will live the life of Blessed Alfonso". It was two months after the infant's birth that Alphonsus de Ligouri was canonized as a saint of the Roman Catholic Church.

=== Childhood and education ===
His parents sent him to a church school where he was entrusted to the priests. This made Alfonso dream of becoming a priest. Fusco built an altar so he could pretend to perform Mass. From his childhood, his parents noticed his compassion for children who were in need, as told in the book Operaio di Dio ('Alfonso Is His Name'), by Monsignor Salvatore Garofalo.

Fusco was a mild and gentle character who was responsive to the plight of the poor. He received his First Communion and Confirmation at the age of seven.

=== Studies and priesthood ===
Fusco – at the age of eleven – informed his parents that he wanted to become a priest and entered the Seminary of Nocera dei Pagani on 5 November 1850. According to Eliodoro Tedesco's Biographic Profile of the Venerable Don Alfonso Maria Fusco, Founder of the Sisters of St. John the Baptist, the presence of the army in 1860 during battles related to unification caused the dispersion of the seminary's archives containing mention of Fusco's coursework. But Giuseppe Nappi recalled that Fusco was always respectful towards his professors. During these days, Fusco had a dream that Jesus Christ ordered him to found a religious institute for sisters as well as an orphanage for boys and girls. Antonio Salomon, Archbishop of Salerno, ordained Fusco in his private oratory in Avellino on 29 May 1863 (Pentecost Sunday). He was assigned to the collegiate Church of f St. John the Baptist in Angri.

== Baptistine Sisters ==
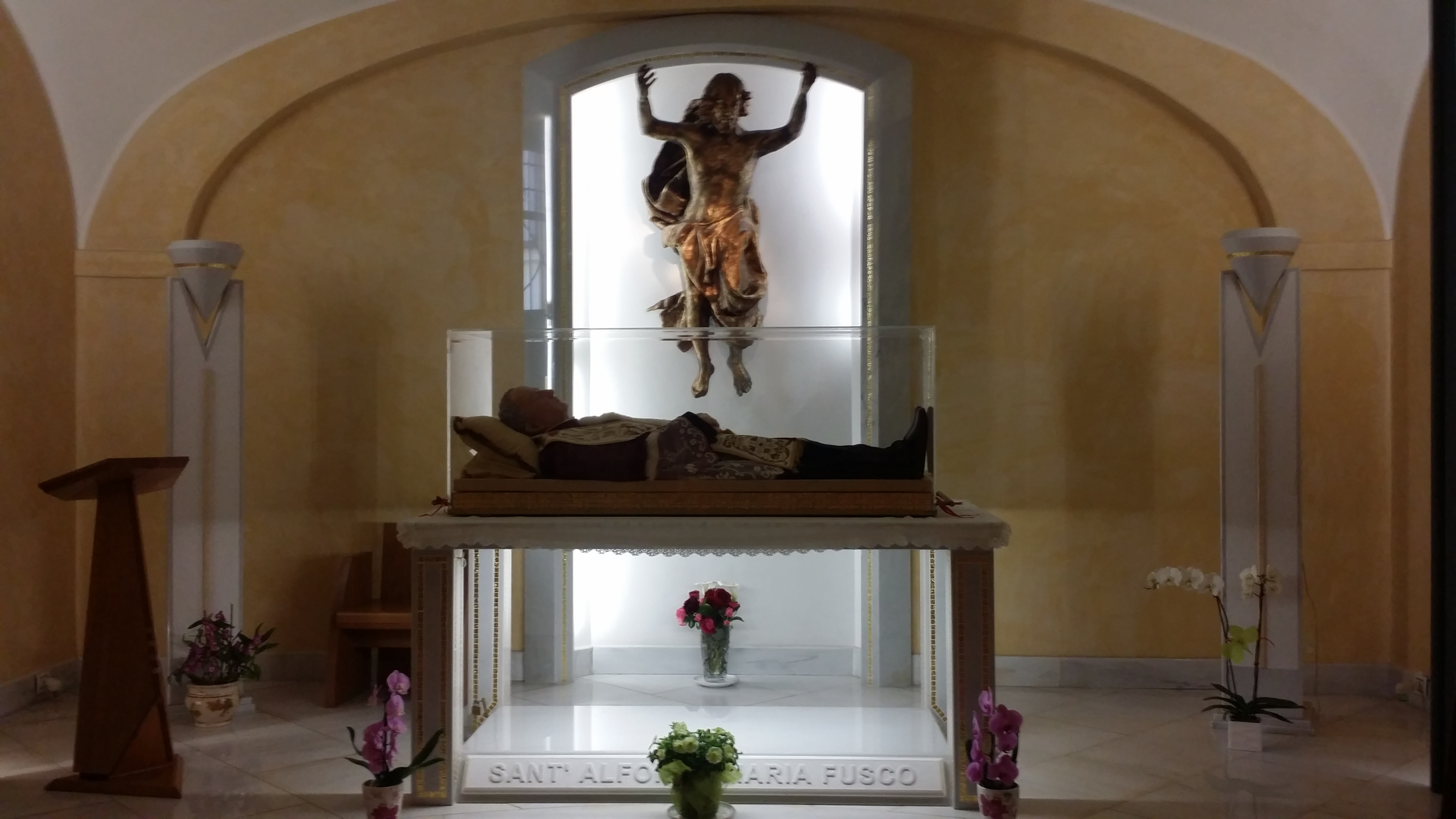
Tomb in Angri.

In a meeting with Maddalena Caputo of Angri he realized this strong-willed woman who wanted to enter religious life was the motivator for him to create a religious institute. On 25 September 1878 three women and Caputo met in Angri and wanted to dedicate themselves to God and His service. It was with them that the Sisters of Saint John the Baptist was established.

Postulants entered as well as orphans though it proved too much for the new sisters and their founder. Fusco accepted this as a trial God sent to him. Bishop Saverio Vitagliano attempted to remove him as the head of the institute based on false accusations; and his own sisters refused to open the door for him of the house on Via Germanico in Rome because of their desire for a division. Cardinal Pietro Respighi – the Vicar of Rome – said: "You have founded this community of good sisters who are doing their best. Now withdraw!"

=== Death ===
Fusco – during the night of 5 February 1910 – felt quite unwell. He requested and received the sacraments on the following morning and after he blessed his own religious daughters exclaimed: "Lord, I thank You, I have been a useless servant". To the sisters he said: "From heaven I will not forget you. I will pray for you always".

== Sainthood ==
The beatification process commenced with an informative process that began on 27 July 1930 and concluded on 22 November 1940. Formal approval of the cause from the Congregation of Rites was issued under Pope Pius XII on 22 June 1951 and bestowed Fusco with the posthumous title of Servant of God. Following this a second process (apostolic process) commenced on 30 July 1952 to continue the work of the previous process and concluded its work on 26 July 1954. All previous processes received formal ratification from Rome on 28 February 1958 and allowed for the C.O.R. to commence their own investigation into the cause.

On 12 February 1976 he was proclaimed to be Venerable after Pope Paul VI acknowledged the fact that Fusco had lived a model life of heroic virtue.

=== Beatification ===
The formal process for the investigation of a miracle commenced on 3 March 1999 and closed not long after on the following 17 March. The medical testimonies and documentation was submitted to the Congregation for the Causes of Saints who ratified the process on 24 September 1999 so that officials could initiate their own evaluation of the alleged miracle. The medical board advising the C.C.S. approved the healing on 20 October 1999 while theologians followed suit on 3 March 2000. The C.C.S. approved it on 11 April 2000 and passed it on to Pope John Paul II who granted papal approval to the miracle on 1 July 2000.

John Paul II beatified Fusco on 7 October 2001.

=== Canonization ===
The postulator for the cause at the time of canonization was Sister Immacolata Maria Vicidomini. The second miracle needed for his canonization occurred in 2009. It was investigated in the diocese of its origin and was sent to Rome for further assessment. On 25 February 2016 the medical board advising the C.C.S. approved it while the consulting theologians also voiced their approval on the following 22 March. The C.C.S. gave their final approval on the following 19 April and as a result could pass this to the pope for his approval.

On 26 April 2016 a second miracle attributed to his intercession received the papal approval of Pope Francis. His canonization date was confirmed after it was formalized at a gathering of cardinals on 20 June 2016. Pope Francis canonized Fusco as a saint of the Roman Catholic Church on 16 October 2016.

=== Feast ===
His liturgical feast is celebrated on February 7, as proclaimed by Pope Francis in Rome on October 16, 2016

== Bibliography ==
- Tedesco, Eliodoro (1995). Biographic Profile of the Venerable Don Alfonso Maria Fusco, Founder of the Sisters of St. John the Baptist. Rome: Sisters of St. John the Baptist. Translated into English by Sr. Christine Labate.
