= Madonna Mia =

Song
- Songwriter: Al Capone

"Madonna Mia" is a love song that was transcribed by American gangster Al Capone while he was imprisoned in Alcatraz. Capone presented a copy of the sheet music for the song to Father Vincent Casey, who visited the prisoners in Alcatraz frequently in the 1930s while training to become a Jesuit priest. Capone created his own arrangement of the song as a tribute to his wife Mae.

In April 2009, a copy of the sheet music and lyrics for the song were put up for sale for US$65,000. Rich Larsen with AlCaponeFanClub.com re-discovered the song after more than 70 years and described it as "a tearjerker". He formed a group of musicians and a vocalist to record the song, which was released on CD May 2009.
