= Al Capone =

American gangster and businessman (1899–1947)

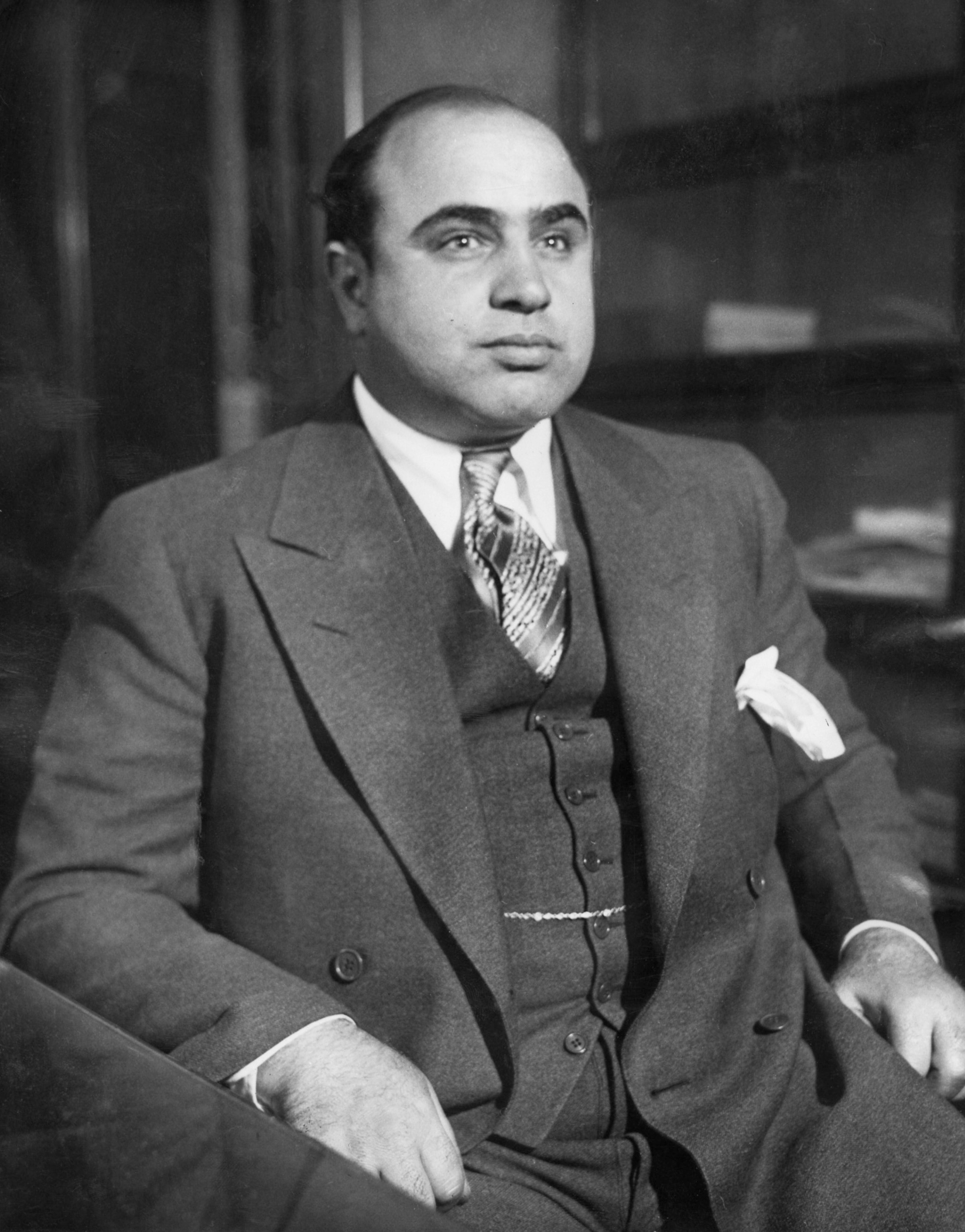
- Capone in 1930
- Born: Alphonse Gabriel Capone; January 17, 1899; New York City, U.S.
- Died: January 25, 1947 (aged 48); Miami Beach, Florida, U.S.
- Resting place: Mount Carmel Cemetery, Hillside, Illinois, U.S.
- Other names: Scarface; Big Al; Big Boy; Public Enemy No. 1; Snorky
- Occupations: Gangster; bootlegger; racketeer
- Known for: Boss of the Chicago Outfit; Saint Valentine's Day Massacre
- Successor: Frank Nitti
- Spouse: Mae Coughlin (m. 1918)
- Children: 1
- Relatives: Richard James Hart (brother); Ralph Capone (brother); Frank Capone (brother); Charles Fischetti (cousin); Rocco Fischetti (cousin)
- Allegiance: Chicago Outfit
- Conviction: Tax evasion (26 U.S.C. § 145) (5 counts)
- Penalty: 11 years imprisonment (1931)

Alphonse Gabriel Capone (/kə.ˈpoʊn/, kə-POHN; Italian: [kaˈpoːne]; January 17, 1899 – January 25, 1947), sometimes known by the nickname "Scarface", was an American gangster and businessman who attained notoriety during the Prohibition era as the co-founder and boss of the Chicago Outfit from 1925 to 1931. His seven-year reign as a crime boss ended when he was imprisoned at the age of 33.

Capone was born in New York City in 1899 to Italian immigrants. He joined the Five Points Gang as a teenager and became a bouncer in organized crime premises such as brothels. In his early twenties, Capone moved to Chicago and became a bodyguard of Johnny Torrio, head of a criminal syndicate that illegally supplied alcohol—the forerunner of the Outfit—and was politically protected through the Unione Siciliana. A conflict with the North Side Gang was instrumental in Capone's rise and fall. Torrio went into retirement after North Side gunmen almost killed him, handing control to Capone. Although Capone expanded the bootlegging business through increasingly violent means, his mutually profitable relationships with Mayor William Hale Thompson and the Chicago Police Department meant he seemed safe from law enforcement.

Capone apparently reveled in attention, such as the cheers from spectators when he appeared at baseball games. He made donations to various charities and was viewed by many as a "modern-day Robin Hood". The Saint Valentine's Day Massacre, in which seven people from rival gangs were murdered in broad daylight, damaged the public image of Chicago and Capone, leading influential citizens to demand government action and newspapers to dub Capone "Public Enemy No. 1".

Federal authorities became intent on jailing Capone and charged him with twenty-two counts of tax evasion. He was convicted of five counts in 1931. During a highly publicized case, the judge admitted as evidence Capone's admissions of his income and unpaid taxes, made during prior and ultimately abortive negotiations to pay the government taxes he owed. He was convicted and sentenced to eleven years in federal prison. After conviction, he replaced his defense team with experts in tax law, and his grounds for appeal were strengthened by a U.S. Supreme Court ruling, although his appeal ultimately failed. Capone showed signs of neurosyphilis early in his sentence and became increasingly debilitated before being released after almost eight years of incarceration. In 1947, he died of cardiac arrest after a stroke.

== Early life ==
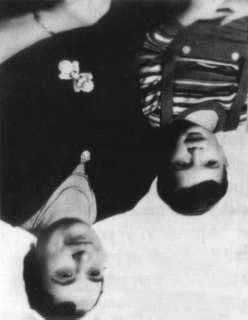
Capone with his mother

Alphonse Gabriel Capone was born in Brooklyn, a borough of New York City, on January 17, 1899. His parents were Italian immigrants Teresa (née Raiola) and Gabriele Capone, both born in Angri, a small municipality outside of Naples in the province of Salerno. His father was a barber and his mother was a seamstress. Capone's family had immigrated to the United States in 1893 by ship, first going through the port city of Fiume, Austria-Hungary (modern-day Rijeka, Croatia). The family settled at 95 Navy Street, in the Brooklyn Navy Yard. When Capone was aged 11, he and his family moved to 38 Garfield Place in Park Slope, Brooklyn.

Capone's parents had eight other children: James Vincenzo Capone, who later changed his name to Richard Hart and became a Prohibition agent in Homer, Nebraska; Raffaele James Capone, also known as Ralph Capone or "Bottles", who took charge of his brother's beverage industry; Salvatore "Frank" Capone; Ermina Capone, who died at the age of one; Ermino "John" Capone; Albert Capone; Matthew Capone and Mafalda Capone. Ralph and Frank worked with Al in his criminal empire. Frank did so until his death on April 1, 1924. Ralph ran Al's bottling companies (both legal and illegal) early on and was also the front man for the Chicago Outfit until he was imprisoned for tax evasion in 1932.

Capone showed promise as a student but had trouble with the rules at his strict parochial Catholic school. His schooling ended at the age of 14 after he was expelled for hitting a female teacher in the face. Capone worked at odd jobs around Brooklyn, including a candy store and a bowling alley. From 1916 to 1918, he played semi-professional baseball. Following this, Capone was influenced by gangster Johnny Torrio, whom he came to regard as a mentor.

Capone married Mae Josephine Coughlin at age 19 on December 30, 1918. She was Irish Catholic and had given birth to their son Albert Francis "Sonny" Capone earlier that month. Albert lost most of his hearing in his left ear as a child. Since Capone was under the age of 21, his parents had to consent in writing to the marriage. By all accounts, the two had a happy marriage.

== Career ==
=== New York City ===
Capone initially became involved with small-time gangs that included the Junior Forty Thieves and the Bowery Boys. He then joined the Brooklyn Rippers, and then the powerful Five Points Gang based in Lower Manhattan. During this time he was employed and mentored by fellow racketeer Frankie Yale, a bartender in a Coney Island dance hall and saloon called the Harvard Inn. Capone inadvertently insulted a woman while working the door, and he was slashed with a knife three times on the left side of his face by her brother, Frank Galluccio; the wounds led to the nickname "Scarface", which Capone loathed. Reports of the date when this occurred are inconsistent. When Capone was photographed, he hid the scarred left side of his face, saying that the injuries were war wounds. He was called "Snorky" by his closest friends, a term for a sharp dresser.

=== Move to Chicago ===
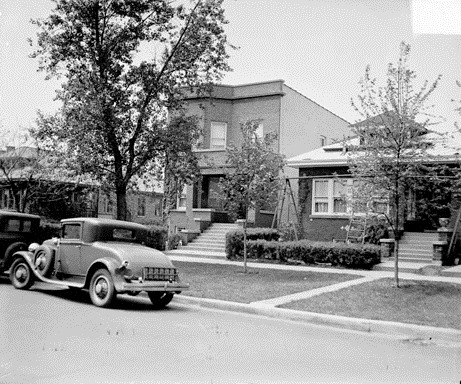
Capone home, a two-story building, Chicago, Illinois, 1929

In 1919, Capone left New York City for Chicago at the invitation of Torrio, who was imported by crime boss James "Big Jim" Colosimo as an enforcer. Capone began in Chicago as a bouncer in a brothel, which is thought to be most likely where he contracted syphilis. Capone was aware of being infected at an early stage and timely use of Salvarsan probably could have cured the infection, but he apparently never sought treatment.

In 1920 or 1921 or 1923, Capone purchased a two-story two-flat six-bedroom building, on a 68-foot-wide double lot, built in 1905, and moved in on August 8, 1923, at 7244 South Prairie Avenue in the Park Manor neighborhood in Greater Grand Crossing, Chicago for $5,500.

As originally reported in the Chicago Tribune, hijacker Joe Howard was killed on May 8, 1924, after he tried to interfere with the Capone-Torrio bootlegging business. In a 1936 article highlighting Capone's criminal career, the Tribune erroneously reported the date as May 7, 1923. In the early years of the decade, Capone's name began appearing in newspaper sports pages where he was described as a boxing promoter. Torrio took over Colosimo's criminal empire after the latter's murder on May 11, 1920, in which Capone was suspected of being involved.

Torrio headed an essentially Italian organized crime group that was the biggest in Chicago, with Capone as his right-hand man. Torrio was wary of being drawn into gang wars and tried to negotiate agreements over territory between rival crime groups. The smaller North Side Gang, led by Dean O'Banion, came under pressure from the Genna brothers who were allied with Torrio. O'Banion found that Torrio was unhelpful with the Gennas' encroachment, despite his pretensions to be a settler of disputes. In a fateful step, Torrio arranged the murder of O'Banion at his flower shop on November 10, 1924. This placed Hymie Weiss at the head of the gang, backed by Vincent Drucci and Bugs Moran. Weiss had been a close friend of O'Banion, and the North Siders made it a priority to get revenge on his killers.

During Prohibition, Capone was involved with Canadian bootleggers who helped him smuggle liquor into the U.S. When Capone was asked if he knew Rocco Perri, billed as Canada's "King of the Bootleggers", he replied: "Why, I don't even know which street Canada is on." Other sources claim that Capone had certainly visited Canada, where he maintained some hideaways, although the Royal Canadian Mounted Police states that there is no "evidence that he ever set foot on Canadian soil".

=== Boss ===
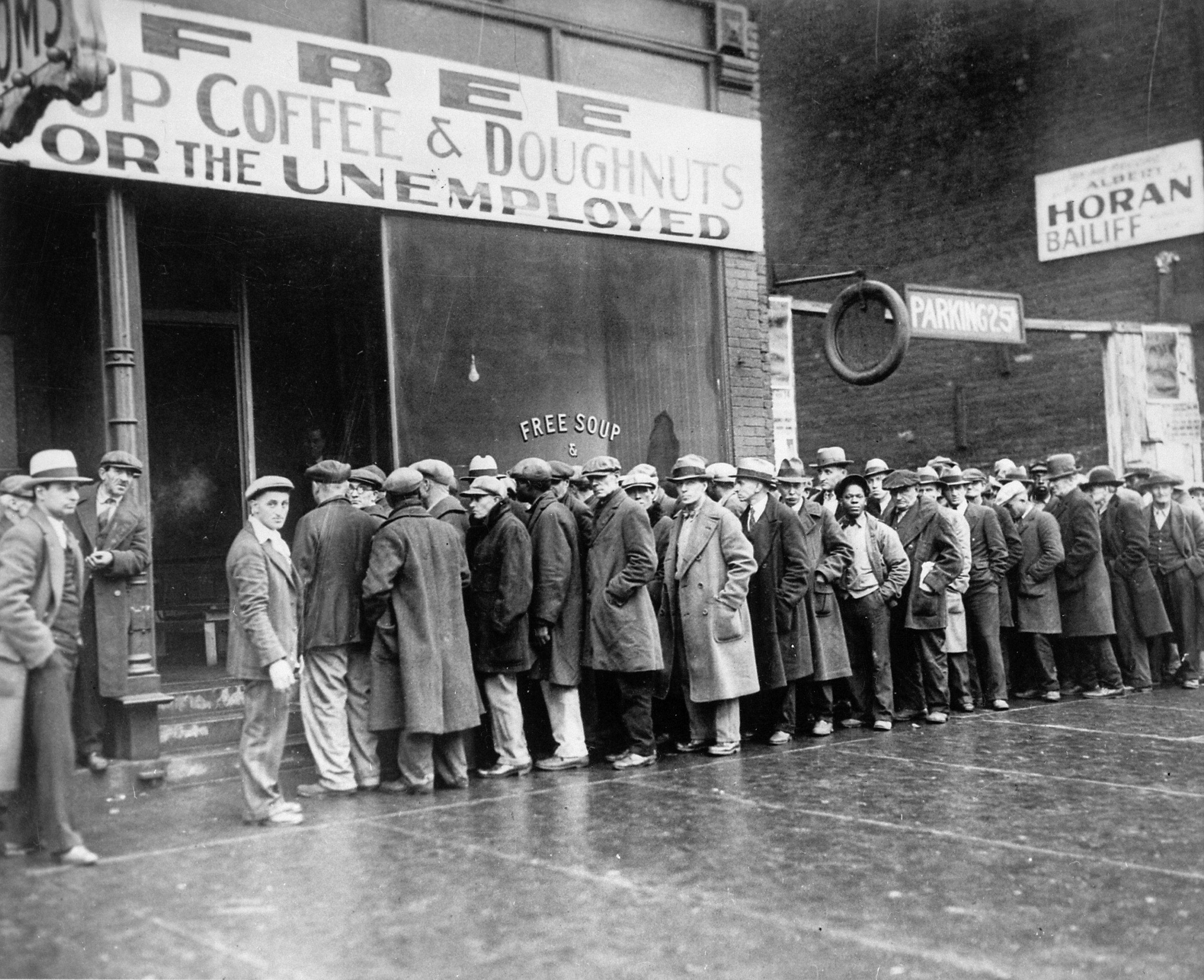
Unemployed men outside a soup kitchen opened by Capone in Chicago during the Great Depression, February 1931

An ambush in January 1925 left Capone shaken, but unhurt. Twelve days later, Torrio was returning from a shopping trip when he was shot several times. After recovering, he effectively resigned and handed control over to Capone, aged 26, who became the new boss of an organization that took in illegal breweries and a transportation network that reached to Canada, with political and law-enforcement protection. In turn, he was able to use more violence to increase revenue. Establishments that refused to purchase liquor from Capone often got blown up, and as many as 100 people were killed in such bombings during the 1920s. Rivals saw Capone as responsible for the proliferation of brothels in the city.

Capone often enlisted the help of local members of the black community into his operations; jazz musicians Milt Hinton and Lionel Hampton had uncles who worked for Capone on Chicago's South Side. A fan of jazz as well, Capone once asked clarinetist Johnny Dodds to play a number that Dodds did not know; Capone split a $100 bill in half and told Dodds that he would get the other half when he learned it. Capone also sent two bodyguards to accompany jazz pianist Earl Hines on a road trip.

Capone indulged in custom suits, cigars, gourmet food and drink, and female companionship. He was particularly known for his flamboyant and costly jewelry. His favorite responses to questions about his activities were "I am just a businessman, giving the people what they want" and "All I do is satisfy a public demand". Capone had become a national celebrity and talking point.

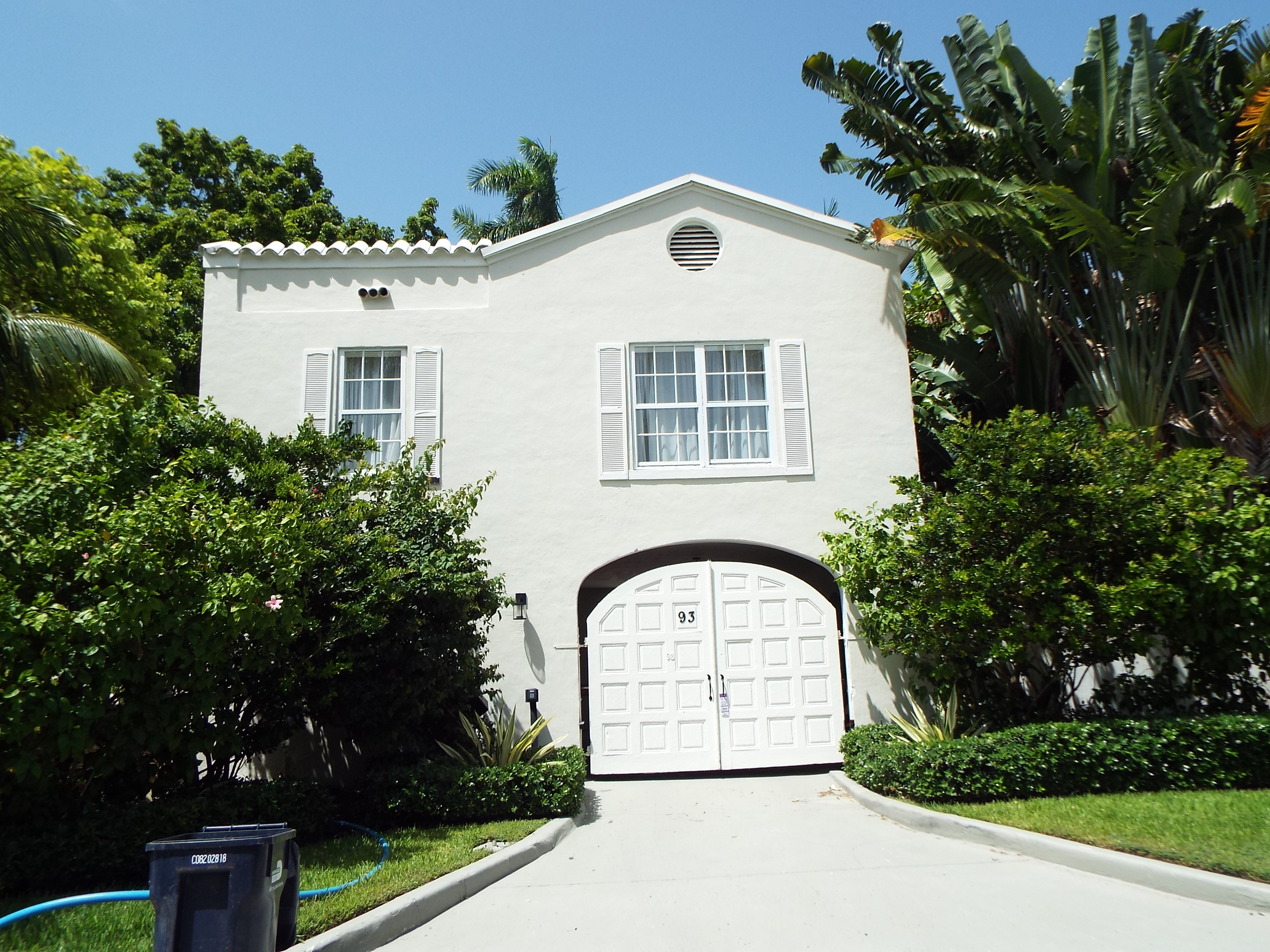
The entrance to Capone's mansion in Palm Island, Florida

Capone based himself in Cicero, Illinois, after using bribery and widespread intimidation to take over town council elections, making it difficult for the North Siders to target him. Capone's driver was found tortured and murdered, and there was an attempt on Weiss' life in the Chicago Loop. On September 20, 1926, the North Siders used a ploy outside Capone's headquarters at the Hawthorne Inn aimed at drawing him to the windows. Gunmen in several cars then opened fire with Thompson submachine guns and shotguns at the windows of the first-floor restaurant. Capone was unhurt and called for a truce, but the negotiations fell flat. Three weeks later, on October 11, Weiss was killed outside the North Siders' headquarters at O'Banion's former flower shop. The owner of Hawthorne's restaurant was a friend of Capone's, and he was kidnapped and killed by Moran and Drucci in January 1927.

Capone became increasingly security-minded and desirous of getting away from Chicago. As a precaution, he and his entourage would often show up suddenly at one of Chicago's train depots and buy up an entire Pullman sleeper car on a night train to Cleveland, Omaha, Kansas City, Little Rock, or Hot Springs, Arkansas, where they would spend a week in luxury hotel suites under assumed names. In 1928, Capone paid $40,000 to Clarence Busch of the Anheuser-Busch brewing family for a 10,000 square foot (930 m^{2}) home at 93 Palm Avenue on Palm Island, Florida, between Miami and Miami Beach.

=== Feud with Aiello ===
In November 1925, Antonio Lombardo, who was Capone's consigliere, was named head of the Unione Siciliana, a Sicilian-American benevolent society that had been corrupted by gangsters. An infuriated Joe Aiello, who had wanted the position himself, believed Capone was responsible for Lombardo's ascension and resented the non-Sicilian's attempts to manipulate affairs within the Unione. Aiello severed all personal and business ties with Lombardo and entered into a feud with Capone.

Aiello allied himself with several of Capone enemies, including Jack Zuta, who ran vice and gambling houses together. Aiello plotted to eliminate both Lombardo and Capone, and starting in the spring of 1927, made several attempts to assassinate Capone. On one occasion, Aiello offered money to the chef of Joseph "Diamond Joe" Esposito's Bella Napoli Café, Capone's favorite restaurant, to put prussic acid in Capone's and Lombardo's soup; reports indicated he offered between $10,000 and $35,000. Instead, the chef exposed the plot to Capone, who responded by dispatching men to destroy Aiello's bakery on West Division Street with machine-gun fire. More than 200 bullets were fired into the bakery on May 28, 1927, wounding Aiello's brother Antonio.

During the summer and autumn of 1927, a number of hitmen Aiello hired to kill Capone were themselves slain. Among them were Anthony Russo and Vincent Spicuzza, each of whom had been offered $25,000 by Aiello to kill Capone and Lombardo. Aiello eventually offered a $50,000 bounty to anyone who eliminated Capone. At least ten gunmen tried to collect on the bounty, but ended up dead. Capone's ally Ralph Sheldon attempted to kill both Capone and Lombardo for Aiello's reward, but Capone henchman, Frank Nitti, had an intelligence network that learned of the transaction and had Sheldon shot in front of a West Side hotel, although he survived the incident.

In November 1927, Aiello organized machine-gun ambushes across from Lombardo's home and a cigar store frequented by Capone, but those plans were foiled after an anonymous tip led police to raid several addresses and arrest Milwaukee gunman Angelo La Mantio and four other Aiello gunmen. After the police discovered receipts for the apartments in La Mantio's pockets, he confessed that Aiello had hired him to kill Capone and Lombardo, leading the police to arrest Aiello himself and bring him to the South Clark Street police station. Upon learning of the arrest, Capone dispatched nearly two dozen gunmen to stand guard outside the station and await Aiello's release. The men made no attempt to conceal their purpose there, and reporters and photographers rushed to the scene to observe Aiello's expected murder. When released, Aiello was given a police escort out of the station to safety. He later failed to make a court appearance after his attorney claimed he suffered a nervous breakdown. Aiello disappeared with some family members to Trenton, New Jersey, where he continued his campaign against Capone and Lombardo.

=== Political alliances ===
Chicago politicians had long been associated with questionable methods, and even newspaper circulation "wars", but the need for bootleggers to have protection in city hall introduced a far more serious level of violence and graft. Capone is generally seen as having an appreciable effect in bringing about the victory of Republican mayoral candidate William Hale Thompson, who had campaigned on a platform of not enforcing Prohibition and at one time hinted that he'd reopen illegal saloons. Thompson allegedly accepted a contribution of $250,000 from Capone. Thompson beat Democratic candidate William Emmett Dever in the 1927 mayoral race by a relatively slim margin.

On the day of the Pineapple Primary on April 10, 1928, voting booths were targeted by Capone's bomber, James Belcastro, in wards where Thompson's opponents were thought to have support, causing the deaths of at least fifteen people. Belcastro was accused of murdering lawyer Octavius C. Granady, an African-American, who challenged Thompson's candidate for the Black vote, and was chased through the streets on polling day by cars of gunmen before being shot dead. Four policemen were among those charged along with Belcastro, but all charges were dropped after key witnesses recanted their statements. An indication of the attitude of local law enforcement toward Capone's organization came in 1931 when Belcastro was wounded in a shooting; police suggested to skeptical journalists that Belcastro was an independent operator. A 1929 report by The New York Times connected Capone to the 1926 murder of Assistant State Attorney William H. McSwiggin, the 1928 murders of chief investigator Ben Newmark, and former mentor Frankie Yale.

=== Saint Valentine's Day Massacre ===
Capone was widely assumed to have been responsible for ordering the 1929 Saint Valentine's Day Massacre, despite being at his Florida home at the time of the massacre. The massacre was an attempt to eliminate Bugs Moran, head of the North Side Gang, and the motivation for the plan may have been the fact that some expensive whisky that was illegally imported from Canada via the Detroit River had been hijacked while it was being transported to Cook County, Illinois. Moran was the last survivor of the North Side gunmen; his succession had come about because his similarly aggressive predecessors, Weiss and Vincent Drucci, had been killed in the violence that followed the murder of original leader Dean O'Banion.

To monitor their targets' habits and movements, Capone's men rented an apartment across from the trucking warehouse and garage at 2122 North Clark Street, which served as Moran's headquarters. On the morning of Thursday, February 14, 1929, Capone's lookouts signaled four gunmen, disguised as police officers, to initiate a "police raid". The faux police lined the seven victims along a wall and signaled for accomplices armed with machine guns and shotguns. Five men had driven up to the garage in a truck; the gunmen flashed police stars and wore parts of police uniform before herding the seven victims to the wall. An electric light overhead illuminated the firing squad's work. A seventh victim, mortally wounded, lived for two hours in another room but maintained the gangland code of silence. Moran was not among the victims. Six of the victims were identified at the scene: Peter Gusenberg and his brother Frank, Al Weinshank, James Clark, John May, and a fifth man identified as Arthur Hayes alias Frank Snyder; a seventh, Arthur Davis, was among Moran's lesser-known followers. Police Commissioner William F. Russell and Coroner Herman N. Bundesen arrived at the scene, along with several assistant state's attorneys. Police immediately determined the killings were a wholesale elimination — Moran's gang, which had been growing in strength for months drawing on the remnants of the gangs once headed by O'Banion and Weiss, was described as virtually annihilated. Photos of the slain victims shocked the public and damaged Capone's image. Within days, Capone received a summons to testify before a Chicago grand jury on charges of federal Prohibition violations, but he claimed to be too unwell to attend. In an effort to clean up his image, Capone donated to charities and sponsored a soup kitchen in Chicago during the Depression. The Saint Valentine's Day Massacre led to public outcry about Thompson's alliance with Capone, and this was a factor in Anton J. Cermak winning the mayoral election on April 6, 1931.

=== Feud with Aiello ends ===
Capone was known for ordering other men to do his work for him. In May 1929, one of Capone's bodyguards, Frank Rio, uncovered a plot by three of his men; Albert Anselmi, John Scalise and Joseph Giunta. They had been persuaded by Aiello to depose Capone and take over the Chicago Outfit. Later on, Capone beat the men with a baseball bat and then ordered his bodyguards to shoot them, a scene that was included in the 1987 film The Untouchables. Deirdre Bair, along with writers and historians such as William Elliot Hazelgrove, have questioned the veracity of the claim.

Bair questioned why "three trained killers could sit quietly and let this happen", while Hazelgrove stated that Capone would have been "hard pressed to beat three men to death with a baseball bat" and that he would have instead let an enforcer perform the murders; however, despite claims that the story was first reported by author Walter Noble Burns in his 1931 book The One-Way Ride: The Red Trail of Chicago Gangland from Prohibition to Jake Lingle, Capone biographers Max Allan Collins and A. Brad Schwartz have found versions of the story in press coverage shortly after the crime. Collins and Schwartz suggest that similarities among reported versions of the story indicate a basis in truth and that the Outfit deliberately spread the tale to enhance Capone's fearsome reputation. George Meyer, an associate of Capone's, also claimed to have witnessed both the planning of the murders and the event itself.

In 1930, upon learning of Aiello's continued plotting against him, Capone resolved to finally eliminate him. In the weeks before Aiello's death, Capone's men tracked him to Rochester, New York, where he had connections through Buffalo crime family boss Stefano Magaddino, and plotted to kill him there, but Aiello returned to Chicago before the plot could be executed. Aiello, angst-ridden from the constant need to hide out and the killings of several of his men, set up residence in the Chicago apartment of Unione Siciliana treasurer Pasquale "Patsy Presto" Prestogiacomo at 205 N. Kolmar Ave. On October 23, upon exiting Prestogiacomo's building to enter a taxicab, a gunman in a second-floor window across the street started firing at Aiello with a submachine gun. Aiello was said to have been shot at least 13 times before he toppled off the building steps and moved around the corner, attempting to move out of the line of fire. Instead, he moved directly into the range of a second submachine gun positioned on the third floor of another apartment block, and was subsequently gunned down.

=== Federal intervention ===
In the wake of the Saint Valentine's Day Massacre, Walter A. Strong, publisher of the Chicago Daily News, asked his friend President Herbert Hoover for federal intervention to stem Chicago's lawlessness. He arranged a secret meeting at the White House, just two weeks after Hoover's inauguration. On March 19, 1929, Strong, joined by Frank Loesch of the Chicago Crime Commission, and Laird Bell, made their case to the president. In Hoover's 1952 Memoir, the former president reported that Strong argued "Chicago was in the hands of the gangsters, that the police and magistrates were completely under their control, ...that the Federal government was the only force by which the city's ability to govern itself could be restored. At once I directed that all the Federal agencies concentrate upon Mr. Capone and his allies." That meeting launched a multi-agency attack on Capone. Treasury and Justice Departments developed plans for income tax prosecutions against Chicago gangsters, and a small, elite squad of Prohibition Bureau agents (whose members included Eliot Ness) were deployed against bootleggers. In a city used to corruption, these lawmen were incorruptible. Charles Schwarz, a writer for the Chicago Daily News, dubbed them Untouchables. To support federal efforts, Strong secretly used his newspaper's resources to gather and share intelligence on the Capone outfit.

=== Trials ===
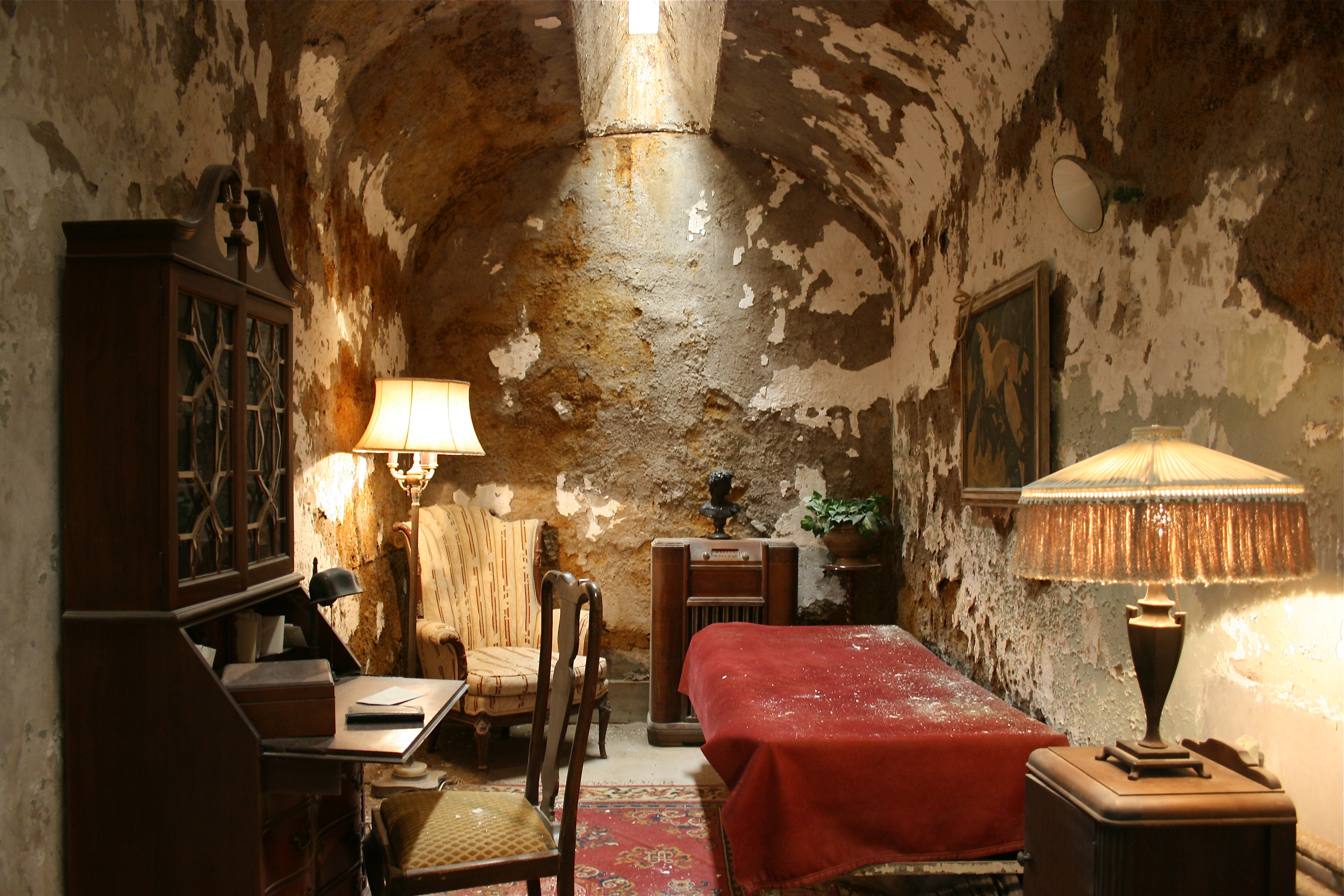
Capone's cell at the now decommissioned Eastern State Penitentiary in Philadelphia, where he spent about nine months starting in May 1929

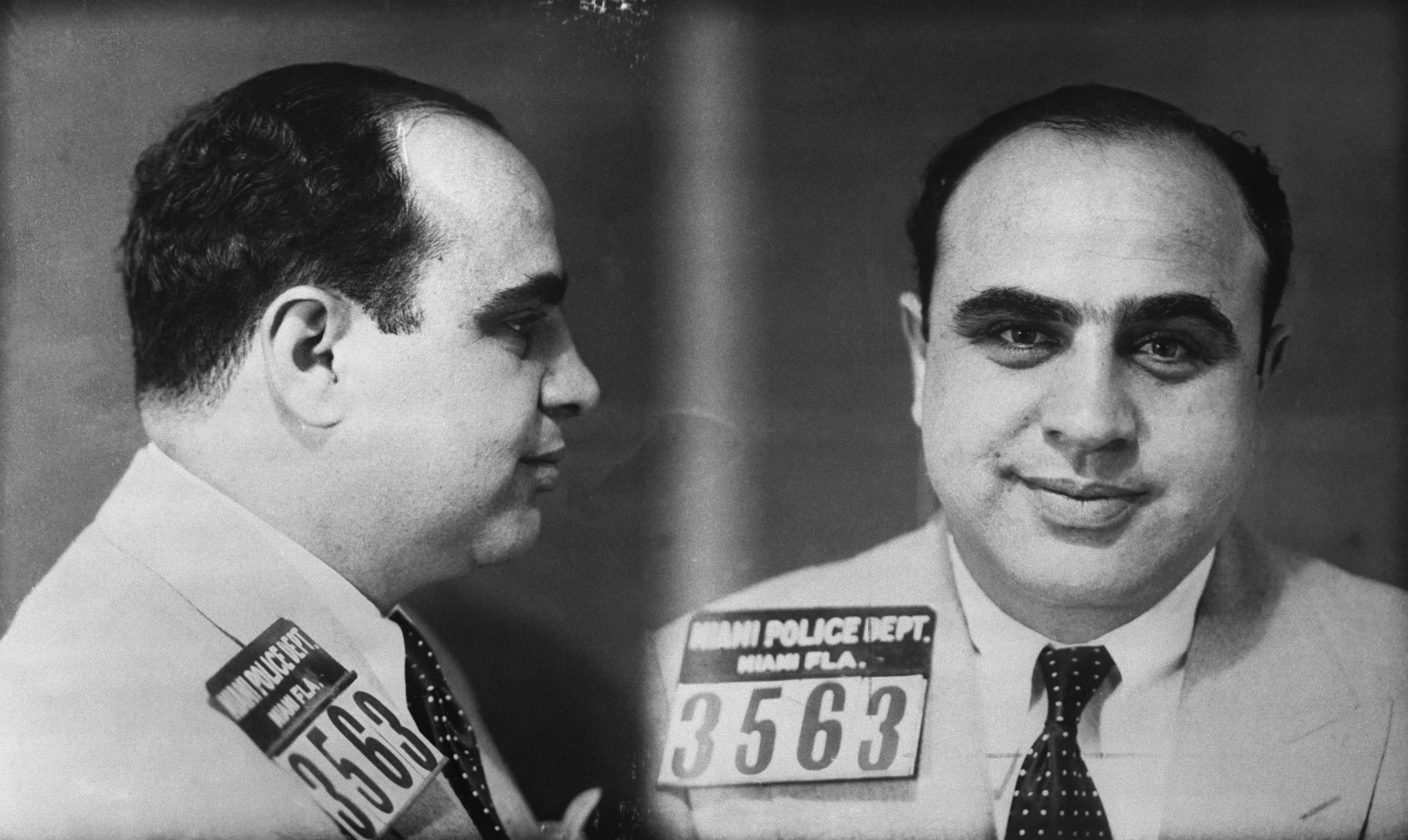
Mug shot of Capone in Miami, 1930

On March 27, 1929, Capone was arrested by FBI agents as he left a Chicago courtroom after testifying to a grand jury that was investigating violations of federal prohibition laws. He was charged with contempt of court for feigning illness to avoid an earlier appearance. On May 16, 1929, Capone was arrested in Philadelphia, Pennsylvania, for carrying a concealed weapon. On May 17, 1929, Capone was indicted by a grand jury and a trial was held before Philadelphia Municipal Court Judge John E Walsh. Entering a guilty plea by his attorney, Capone was sentenced to a prison term of one year. On August 8, 1929, Capone was transferred to Philadelphia's Eastern State Penitentiary. A week after his release in March 1930, Capone was listed as "Public Enemy #1" on the unofficial Chicago Crime Commission's widely publicized list.

In April 1930, Capone was arrested on vagrancy charges when visiting Miami Beach; the governor had ordered sheriffs to run him out of the state. Capone claimed that Miami police had refused him food and water and threatened to arrest his family. He was charged with perjury for making these statements, but was acquitted after a three-day trial in July. In September, a Chicago judge issued a warrant for Capone's arrest on charges of vagrancy and then used the publicity to run against Thompson in the Republican primary. In February 1931, Capone was tried on the contempt of court charge. In court, Judge James Herbert Wilkerson, intervened to reinforce questioning of Capone's doctor by the prosecutor. Wilkerson sentenced Capone to six months, but he remained free while on appeal of the contempt conviction.

In February 1930, Capone's organization was linked to the murder of Julius Rosenheim, who served as a police informant in the Chicago Outfit for 20 years.

=== Tax evasion ===
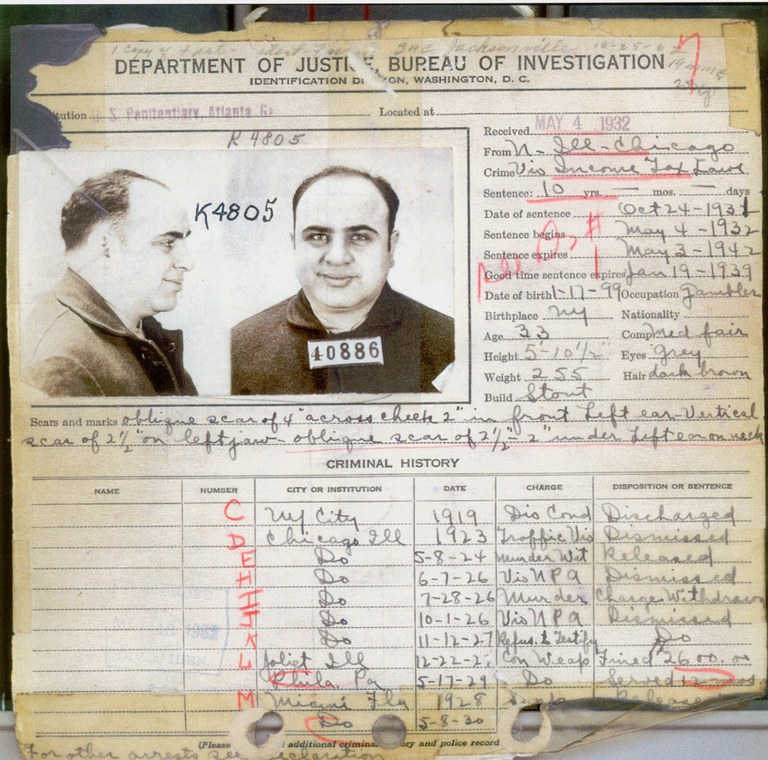
Capone's FBI criminal record in 1932, showing most of his criminal charges were discharged or dismissed

U.S. Assistant Attorney General Mabel Walker Willebrandt is said to have originated the tactic of charging obviously wealthy crime figures with federal tax evasion on the basis of their luxurious lifestyles. In 1927, the U.S. Supreme Court ruled in United States v. Sullivan that the approach was legally sound: illegally earned income was subject to income tax. The key to Capone's conviction on tax charges was not his spending, but proving his income, and the most valuable evidence in that regard originated in his offer to pay tax. Ralph, his brother and a gangster in his own right, was tried for tax evasion in 1930. Ralph spent the next 18 months in prison after being convicted in a two-week trial over which Wilkerson presided.

Seeking to avoid the same fate, Capone ordered his lawyer to regularize his tax position, and although it was not done, his lawyer made crucial admissions when stating the income that Capone was willing to pay tax on for various years, admitting income of $100,000 for 1928 and 1929, for instance; hence, without any investigation, the government had been given a letter from a lawyer acting for Capone conceding his large taxable income for certain years he had paid no tax on. On March 13, 1931, Capone was charged with income tax evasion for 1924, in a secret grand jury. On June 5, 1931, Capone was indicted by a federal grand jury on 22 counts of income tax evasion from 1925 through 1929; he was released on $50,000 bail. Capone was then indicted on 5,000 violations of the Volstead Act (Prohibition laws).

On June 16, 1931, at the Chicago Federal Building in the courtroom of Wilkerson, Capone pleaded guilty to income tax evasion and the 5,000 Volstead Act violations as part of a 2 1/2-year prison sentence plea bargain. On July 30, 1931, Wilkerson refused to honor the plea bargain, and Capone's counsel rescinded the guilty pleas. On the second day of the trial, Wilkerson deemed that the 1930 letter to federal authorities could be admitted into evidence, overruling objections that a lawyer could not confess for his client. Wilkerson later tried Capone only on the income tax evasion charges as he determined they took precedence over the Volstead Act charges.

Much was later made of other evidence, such as witnesses and ledgers, but these strongly implied Capone's control rather than stating it. Capone's lawyers, who had relied on the plea bargain Wilkerson refused to honor, therefore had mere hours to prepare for the trial, ran a weak defense focused on claiming that essentially all his income was lost to gambling. This would have been irrelevant regardless, since gambling losses can only be subtracted from gambling winnings, but it was further undercut by Capone's expenses, which were well beyond what his claimed income could support; Wilkerson allowed Capone's spending to be presented at very great length.

The government charged Capone with evasion of $215,000 in taxes on a total income of $1,038,654, during the five-year period. Capone was convicted on five counts of income tax evasion on October 17, 1931, and was sentenced a week later to 11 years in federal prison, fined $50,000 plus $7,692 for court costs, and was held liable for $215,000 plus interest due on his back taxes. The contempt of court sentence was served concurrently. New lawyers hired to represent Capone were Washington-based tax experts. They filed a writ of habeas corpus based on a Supreme Court ruling that tax evasion was not fraud, which apparently meant that Capone had been convicted on charges relating to years that were actually outside the time limit for prosecution; however, a judge interpreted the law so that the time that Capone had spent in Miami was subtracted from the age of the offences, thereby denying the appeal of both Capone's conviction and sentence.

In a July 1931 interview with the Chicago Herald and Examiner, after an initial guilty plea but before his final conviction and sentencing, Capone offered what he called a "swan song of a racketeer."

"I am only 32," Capone said. "I want the people to realize that in my few adult years it would have been utterly impossible for me to have done all the things that have been credited to me. . . . I see nothing morally wrong in making a living out of prohibition. And violating the prohibition law and running some gambling places make up the only so-called crimes I ever have committed. The Capone, as portrayed in books, in newspapers and in conversations by people who are supposed to know me well is a person I don't recognize or know. I have always been opposed to violence—to shootings. I have fought, yes, but fought for peace. And I believe I can take credit for the peace that now exists in the racket game in Chicago."

Capone, apparently confused about the forces that had brought him to justice, credited the Secret Six for his downfall. The powerful, well-funded vigilante organization, launched in 1930 and brought down by scandal in 1933, had reportedly sent one of his bookkeepers on a South American cruise so Capone couldn't murder him before he testified. But the Secret Six did not otherwise contribute to the tax evasion case against Capone, nor to raids of his breweries by Eliot Ness and his Untouchables. Nevertheless, Capone said, "The Secret Six has licked the rackets. They've licked me. They've made it so there's no money in the game any more. Most of the fellows who've been working with me realize this as well as I do. That's why I think they'll do the same thing as I'm going to do when I come back from Leavenworth—go into honest business."

=== Imprisonment ===
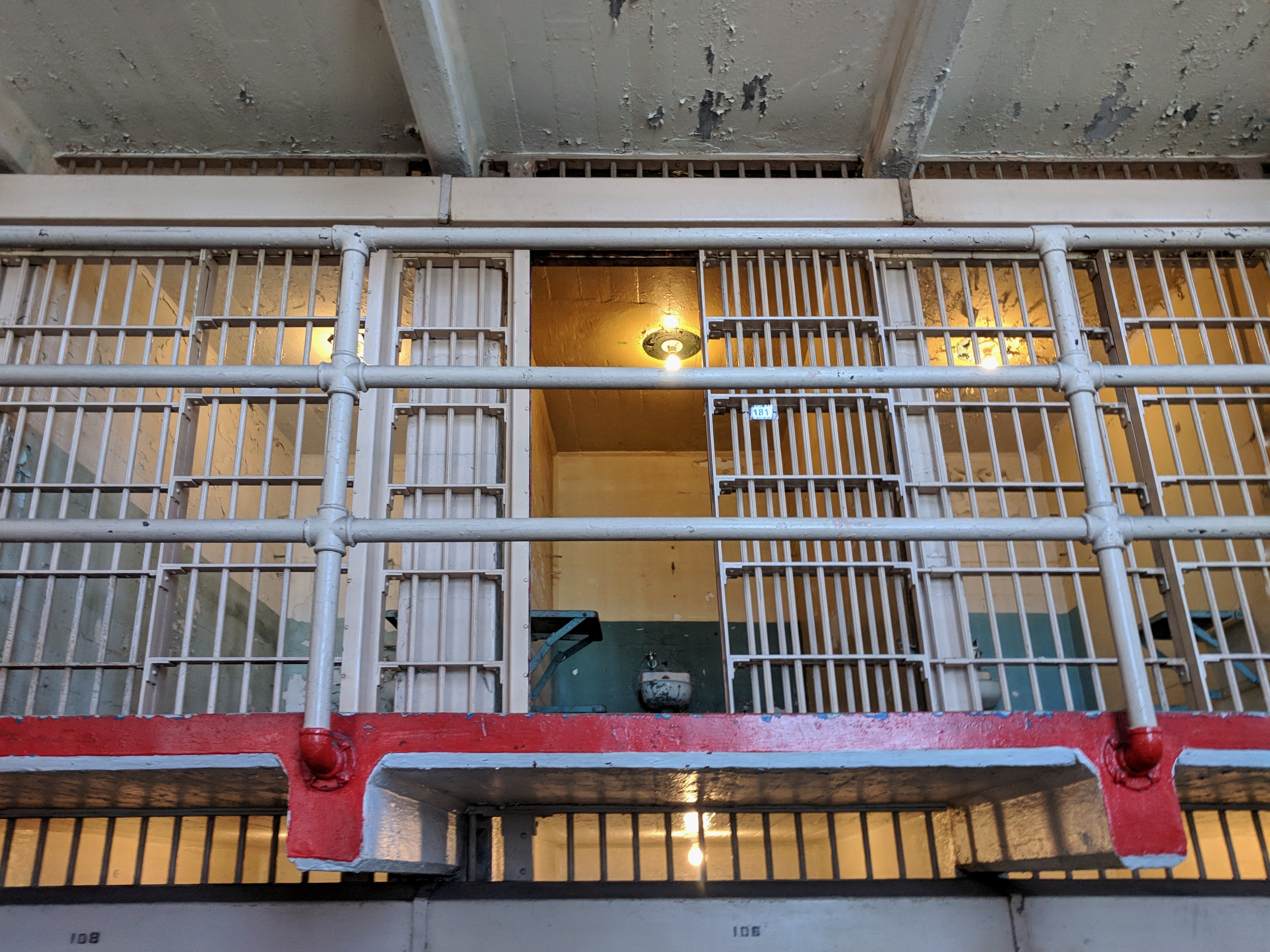
Cell 181 in Alcatraz Federal Penitentiary where Capone was imprisoned

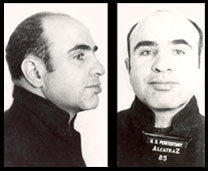
Mug shot of Capone at Alcatraz Federal Penitentiary, 1934

Capone was sent to Atlanta U.S. Penitentiary in May 1932, aged 33. Upon his arrival, Capone was diagnosed with syphilis and gonorrhea. Morris Rudensky was formerly a small-time criminal associated with the Capone gang and found himself becoming a protector for Capone. The conspicuous protection by Rudensky and other prisoners drew accusations from less friendly inmates and fueled suspicion that Capone was receiving special treatment. No solid evidence ever emerged, but it formed part of the rationale for moving Capone to the recently opened Alcatraz Federal Penitentiary off the coast of San Francisco, in August 1934. Capone arrived at Alcatraz alongside 66 other federal prisoners at what wire reports were already calling the "American Devil's Island" — designed, federal authorities stated, specifically to cut off its inmates from all contact with the outside world. The prison sat a mile and a quarter from the nearest shore, with watch towers projecting from its castle-like battlements and guards armed with high-powered rifles; no boat, swimmer, or airplane could approach within 300 yards. Federal authorities stated that the isolation was specifically desired for Capone, to prevent him from maintaining contacts with the Chicago underworld during his remaining sentence. On June 23, 1936, Capone was stabbed and superficially wounded by fellow Alcatraz inmate James C. Lucas.

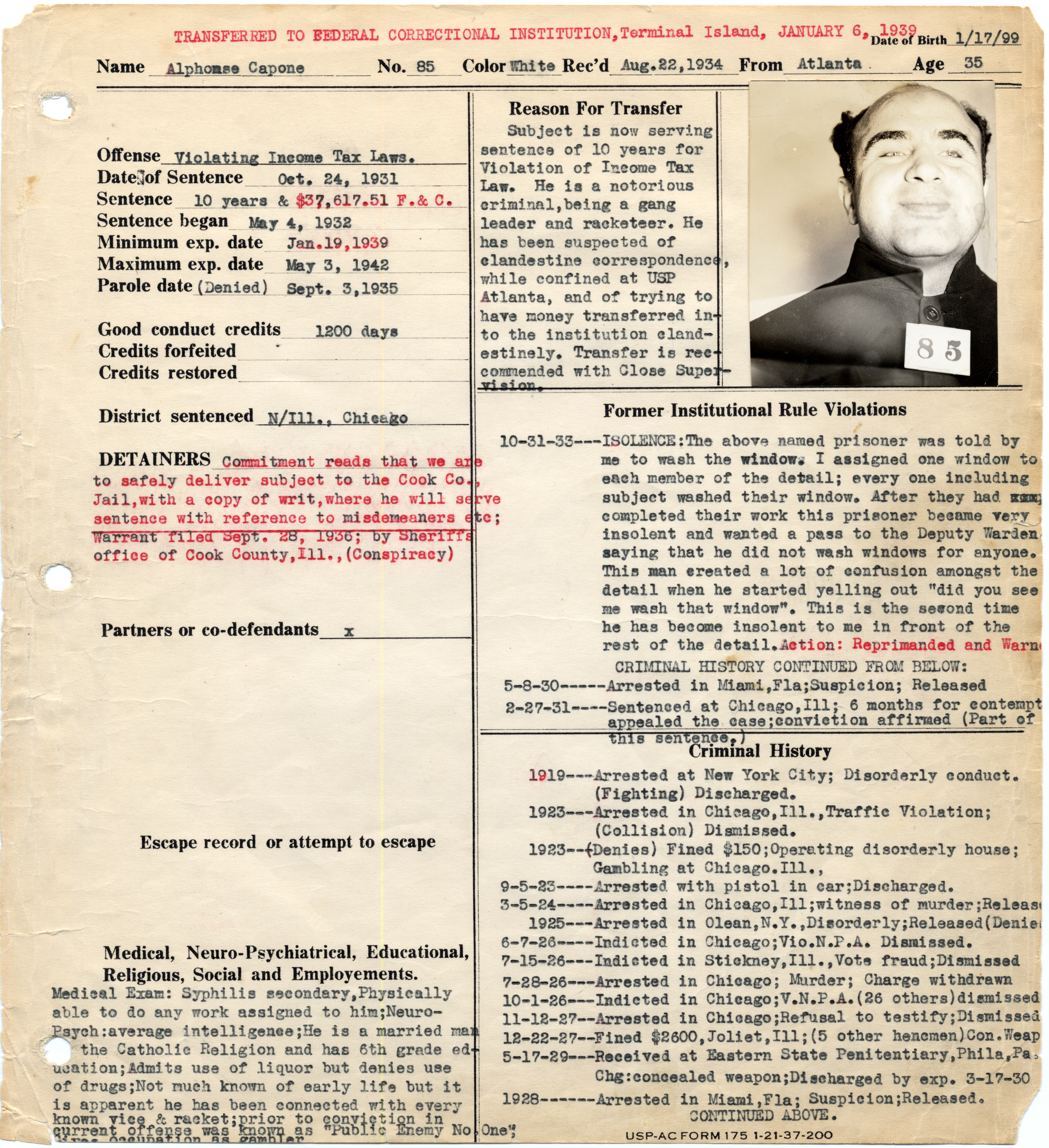
Capone's inmate file from Alcatraz Prison

Due to his good behavior, Capone was permitted to play banjo in the Alcatraz prison band, the Rock Islanders, which gave regular Sunday concerts for other inmates. Capone also transcribed the song "Madonna Mia" creating his own arrangement as a tribute to his wife Mae. At Alcatraz, Capone's decline became increasingly evident, as neurosyphilis progressively eroded his mental faculties; his formal diagnosis of syphilis of the brain was made in February 1938. He spent the last year of his Alcatraz sentence in the hospital section, confused and disoriented. Capone completed his term in Alcatraz on January 6, 1939, and was transferred to the Federal Correctional Institution at Terminal Island in California to serve out his sentence for contempt of court. He was paroled on November 16, 1939, after his wife Mae appealed to the court, based on his reduced mental capabilities.

== Chicago aftermath ==
The main effect of Capone's conviction was that he ceased to be boss immediately on his imprisonment, but those involved in the jailing of Capone portrayed it as a considerable undermining of the city's organized crime syndicate. Capone's underboss, Frank Nitti, took over as boss of the Outfit after he was released from prison in March 1932, having also been convicted of tax evasion charges. Far from being smashed, the Outfit continued without being troubled by the Chicago police, but at a lower level and without the open violence that had marked Capone's rule.

Organized crime in the city had a lower profile once Prohibition was repealed, already wary of attention after seeing Capone's notoriety bring him down, to the extent that there is a lack of consensus among writers about who was actually in control and who was a figurehead "front boss". Prostitution, labor union racketeering, and gambling became moneymakers for organized crime in the city without incurring serious investigation. In the late 1950s, FBI agents discovered an organization led by Capone's former lieutenants reigning supreme over the Chicago underworld. Some historians have speculated that Capone ordered the 1939 murder of Edward J. O'Hare a week before his release, for helping federal prosecutors convict Capone of tax evasion, though there are other theories for O'Hare's death.

== Illness and death ==
Due to his failing health, Capone was released from prison on November 16, 1939, and referred to Johns Hopkins Hospital in Baltimore for the treatment of syphilitic paresis. Because of his unsavory reputation, Johns Hopkins refused to treat him, but Baltimore's Union Memorial Hospital did. Capone was grateful for the compassionate care that he received and donated two Japanese weeping cherry trees to Union Memorial Hospital in 1939. After a few weeks of inpatient and outpatient care, on March 20, 1940, a very sickly Capone left Baltimore and traveled to his mansion in Palm Island, Florida. In 1942, after mass production of penicillin was started in the United States, Capone was one of the first American patients treated by the new drug. (Note: The first use of penicillin in the United States was on March 14, 1942, for a patient with streptococcal sepsis.) Although it was too late for the drug to reverse the damage to his brain, it did slow down the progression of the disease.

In 1946, his physician and a Baltimore psychiatrist examined him and concluded that Capone had the mentality of a 12-year-old child. He spent the last years of his life at his Palm Island mansion, spending time with his wife and grandchildren. On January 21, 1947, Capone had a stroke. He regained consciousness and started to improve, but contracted bronchopneumonia. He suffered a cardiac arrest on January 22, and on January 25, surrounded by his family in his home, died after his heart failed as a result of apoplexy. His attending physician, Dr. Kenneth Phillips, who was at the bedside when Capone died at 7:25 p.m. EST, announced that funeral services would be held privately in Miami, with the date and time to be determined by the family. Dr. Phillips had requested an autopsy of the brain "for the benefit of science and its possible benefit on future medical history," but the family objected. Mae Capone, who collapsed when her husband died, was reported to be still in shock and "not in good physical condition" the following day. His body was transported back to Chicago a week later and a private funeral was held. He was originally buried at Mount Olivet Cemetery in Chicago. In 1950, Capone's remains, along with those of his father, Gabriele, and brother, Frank, were moved to Mount Carmel Cemetery in Hillside, Illinois.

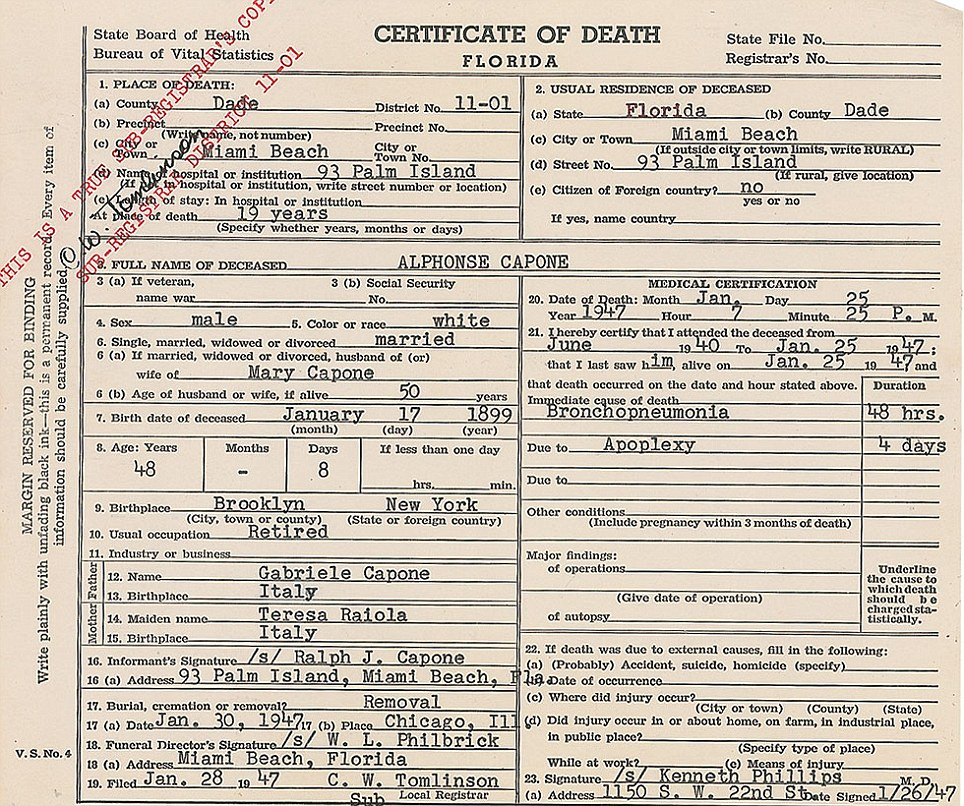
Capone's death certificate January 25, 1947

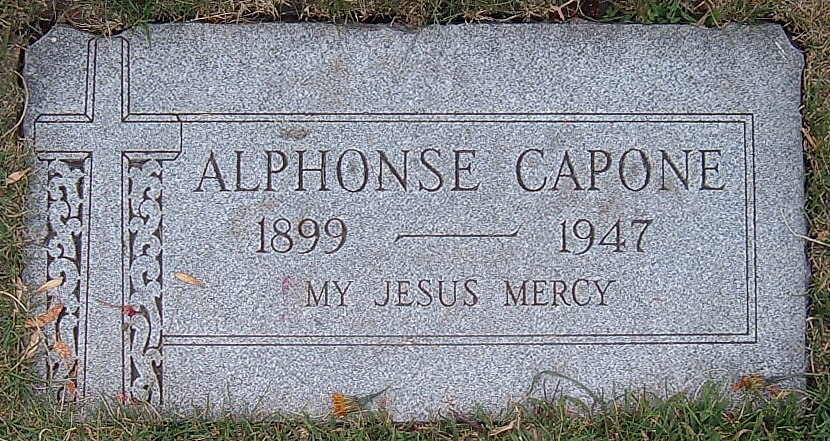
Capone's grave in Mount Carmel Cemetery, Hillside, Illinois

== In popular culture ==
Capone is one of the most notorious American gangsters of the 20th century and has been the major subject of numerous articles, books, and films. Particularly, from 1925 to 1929, shortly after he moved to Chicago, he enjoyed his status as the most notorious mobster in the country. He cultivated a certain image of himself in the media that made him a subject of fascination.

== See also ==
- Al Capone bibliography
- List of the Great Depression-era outlaws
- The Mystery of Al Capone's Vaults
- Timeline of organized crime

== Notes ==
American Mafia
Preceded by Johnny Torrio	Chicago Outfit; Underboss; 1920–1925	Succeeded by Frank Nitti
Preceded by Johnny Torrio	Chicago Outfit; Boss; 1925–1931	Succeeded by Frank Nitti
