= Al Capone bibliography =

A list of books about Prohibition era gangster Al Capone:

- Bair, Dierdre (2016). Al Capone: His Life, Legacy, and Legend. Knopf Doubleday Publishing Group. ISBN 978-0385537162.
- Balsamo, William; Balsamo, John (13 December 2013). Young Al Capone: The Untold Story of Scarface in New York, 1899-1925. Skyhorse Publishing Company, Incorporated. ISBN 978-1-62636-730-2.
- Barrett, Erin; Mingo, Jack (31 May 2002). Al Capone was a Golfer: Hundred of Fascinating Facts From the World of Golf. Conari Press. ISBN 978-1-57324-720-7.
- Bergreen, Laurence (21 May 2013). Capone: The Man and the Era. Simon and Schuster. ISBN 978-1-4391-2845-9.
- Bulow, Harry Von (April 2005). Harry Jr., Billy and Al Capone: An Autobiography. AuthorHouse. ISBN 978-1-4208-1256-5.
- Capone, Deirdre Marie (October 2010). Uncle Al Capone: The Untold Story from Inside His Family. Recaplodge LLC. ISBN 978-0-9828451-0-3.
- Collins, Max Allan; Schwartz, A. Brad (August 2018). Scarface and the Untouchable: Al Capone, Eliot Ness, and the Battle for Chicago. William Morrow. ISBN 978-0062441942.
- Enright, Richard T. (1931). Al Capone on the Spot: The Inside Story of Chicago's Master Criminal. Graphic Arts Corporation.
- Hendley, Nate (1 July 2010). Al Capone: Chicago's King of Crime. Five Rivers Chapmanry. ISBN 978-0-9866423-1-9.
- Hoffman, Dennis E. (31 August 2010). Scarface Al and the Crime Crusaders: Chicago's Private War Against Capone. SIU Press. ISBN 978-0-8093-8596-6.
- Iorizzo, Luciano J. (2003). Al Capone: A Biography. Greenwood Publishing Group. ISBN 978-0-313-32317-1.
- Kobler, John (1992). Capone: The Life and World of Al Capone. Da Capo Press. ISBN 978-0-306-80499-1.
- Pasley, Fred D. (October 2013). Al Capone: The Biography of a Self-Made Man. Literary Licensing, LLC. ISBN 978-1-258-83353-4.
- Teitelbaum, Robert; Carter, Cindy (15 December 2014). Frogs and Snails and Mobster Tales: Growing Up in Al Capone's Shadow. Cindy Carter. ISBN 978-0-692-34370-8.
- Waller, Irle (1965). Chicago Uncensored: Firsthand Stories about the Al Capone Era. Exposition Press.
- Winkeler, Georgette (2011). Al Capone and His American Boys: Memoirs of a Mobster's Wife. Indiana University Press. ISBN 978-0-253-35606-2.
- Wright, S. Fowler (1 March 2008). The Capone Caper: Mr. Jellipot Vs. the King of Crime. Wildside Press LLC. ISBN 978-1-4344-0238-7.
