= Angri =

- Comune
- Comune di Angri
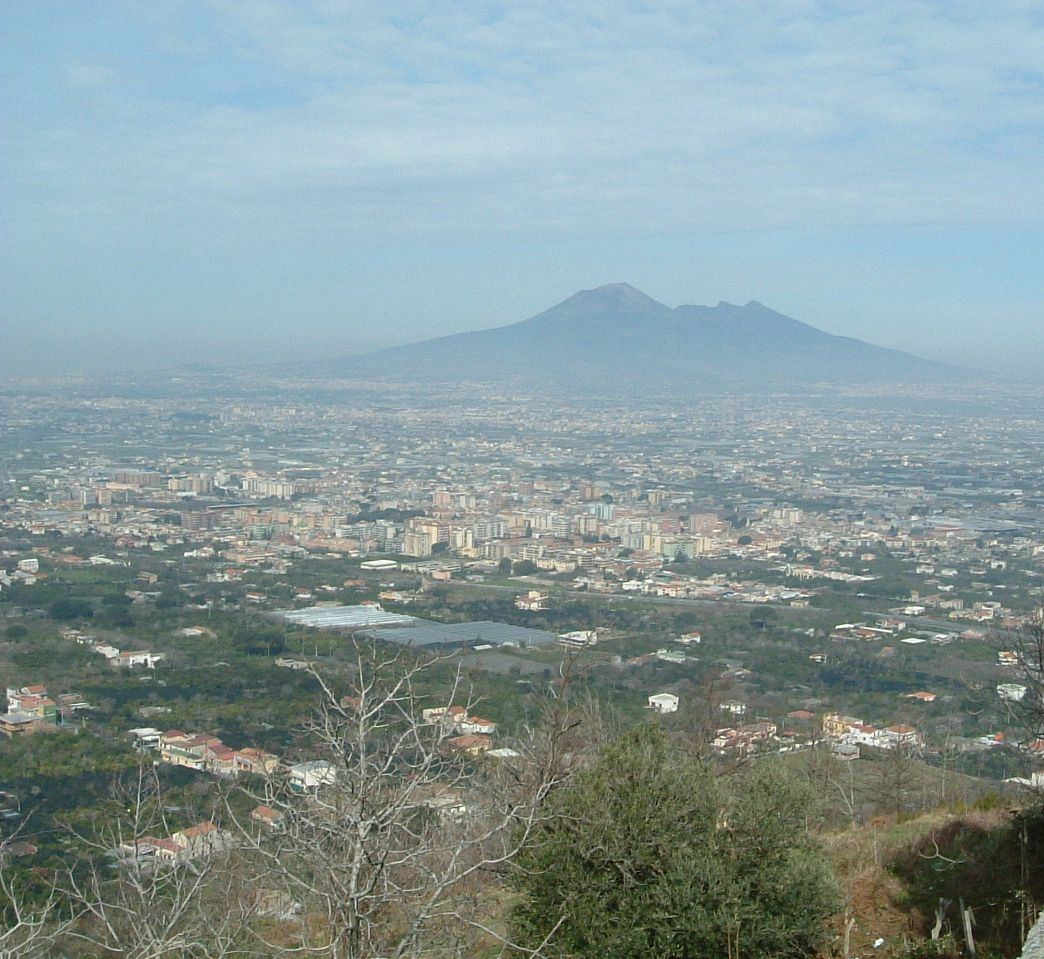
- Motto: Universitas Terræ Angriæ
- Location within Italy Location within Campania
- Coordinates: 40°44′N 14°34′E
- Country: Italy
- Region: Campania
- Province: Salerno (SA)

Area
  - Total: 13.77 km^{2} (5.32 sq mi)
- Elevation: 25 m (82 ft)

Population (31 December 2017)
  - Total: 34,126
  - Density: 2,478/km^{2} (6,419/sq mi)
- Demonym: Angresi
- Time zone: UTC+1 (CET)
  - Summer (DST): UTC+2 (CEST)
- Postal code: 84012
- Dialing code: 081
- ISTAT code: 065007
- Patron saint: St. John the Baptist
- Saint day: 24 June
- Website: Official website

Angri is a town and comune in the province of Salerno, Campania, southern Italy. It is around 15 miles (24 km) northwest of the town of Salerno.

== History ==
The Byzantine general Narses defeated Teias, the last king of the Goths, nearby in AD 553.

In the 19th century, the city had a population of around 10,000 and its hinterland produced large quantities of grapes, tobacco, and cotton.

Angri was the native town of Gabriele Capone and Teresina Raiola, who emigrated to the United States and gave birth to Al Capone, a prominent gangster. Angri was also the hometown of Capone's successor of the Chicago Outfit, Frank Nitti, and of the Roman Catholic priest, Blessed Alfonso Maria Fusco, whose feast is February 6.

== Geography ==
Angri is a part of the Agro Nocerino Sarnese, near the Vesuvian area, and together with Scafati is the extreme part of the Salerno Province. The communal territory is at the base of the Lattari's mountains in the heart of the Sarno's valley, the most fertile areas of Italy.

=== Climate ===
The climate is temperate, given the proximity of the sea. Summer is often hot with daytime temperatures in the low to mid 30s Celsius. Heavy downpours are common in winter, often accompanied by moderate winds. Frosts and snow are rare.

== Main sights ==
Sights in the city include the Castle and Doria's palace, the town park (the garden of the palace).

The churches are: the Collegiate Church of St. John the Baptist, the brotherhood of Santa Margherita, the church of Santa Maria of Constantinople, the former Grange of the Certosa di San Giacomo di Capri Pizzauto, the church of Santissima Annunziata with the museum of the Blessed can . Fusco, the Carmelite church, St. Catherine, St. Benedict, the brotherhood of Santa Margherita, the chapel of St. Cosmas and Damian.

== Transport ==
Angri is connected to the Autostrada A3 motorways. Angri station is the railway station of the city that allows moving to Naples and Salerno.

== Sport ==
The city's main football team is U.S. Angri Calcio 1927 A.S.D.

Basketball teams include:

- A.S.D Angri Basket
- Polisportiva A. Negro Angri basket
- Polisportiva S.C.A. Basket 2009

== Sources ==
- "Angri" , Encyclopædia Britannica, vol. II (9th ed.), New York: Charles Scribner's Sons, 1878, p. 46.
- Istituto Nazionale di Statistica. 2001 Census Data. (in Italian)

== Bibliography ==
=== Publications ===
- Gennaro Orlando (1866). Storia di Nocera de' Pagani [History of Nocera de' Pagani] (in Italian). Naples (NA).
- Michele De' Santi. Memorie Storiche delle Famiglie Nocerine [Historical Memoirs of the Nocerine Families] (in Italian). Naples (NA).
- Vincenzo Pastore (1980). Angri dalla preistoria ai nostri giorni [Angri from prehistory to the present day] (in Italian). Cava De' Tirreni (SA).
- Gian Guido Turchi (1989). Edizioni ETR (ed.). A Napoli centocinquant'anni fa. Terza fu la Bayard in I Treni oggi [In Naples one hundred and fifty years ago. Third was Bayard in Trains Today] (in Italian). nr. 89. Salò (BS).
- Gennaro Zurolo (2004). Regesto del documento d'Archivio del XV secolo. Atto di fondazione del Convento e Chiesa della SS. Annunziata di Angri [Summary of the 15th century archive document. Deed of foundation of the Convent and Church of the SS. Annunziata of Angri] (in Italian). Angri (SA).
- Gennaro Zurolo (2008). Le Strade di Angri - la toponomastica, i personaggi, le storie [The Streets of Angri - the toponymy, the characters, the stories] (in Italian). Boscoreale (NA).
- Gennaro Zurolo (2010). Tra fede e storia - arte, miti, leggende della Terra d'Angri [Between faith and history - art, myths, legends of the Terra d'Angri] (in Italian). Angri (SA).
- Gennaro Zurolo (2010). Il riscatto di Zurolo (26 giugno 1428), Regesto del documento d'Archivio del XV secolo, Diploma Reale di Giovanna II d'Angiò [The ransom of Zurolo (26 June 1428), Summary of the 15th century archive document, Royal Diploma of Joan II of Anjou] (in Italian). Angri (SA).
- Gennaro Zurolo (2013). Regesto documento d'archivio del XVIII secolo riguardante la Cappella gentilizia della famiglia Pisacane sotto il titolo di S. Maria di Montevergine [18th century archive document regarding the noble chapel of the Pisacane family under the title of S. Maria di Montevergine] (in Italian). Angri (SA).
- Gennaro Zurolo (2018). Le origini del culto Giovannita, ovvero di San Giovanni Battista nella Terra d'Angri. Tracce templari e gerosolomitane dei Cavalieri di Malta nell'antico territorio angrese [The origins of the Giovannita cult, or of Saint John the Baptist in the Land of Angri. Templar and Gerosolomitan traces of the Knights of Malta in the ancient Angrese territory] (in Italian). Nola (NA).
- Gennaro Zurolo (2019). Sulle origini di una chiesa angioina nella Terra d'Angri: la SS. Annunziata [On the origins of an Angevin church in the Terra d'Angri: the SS. Annunziata] (in Italian). Nola (NA).

=== Books ===
- Lucio Villari (1989). Ferrovie dello Stato (ed.). Nove minuti che fecero una storia 1839-1989: I centocinquantanni delle Ferrovie Italiane [Nine minutes that made history 1839-1989: The one hundred and fifty years of the Italian Railways] (in Italian). Vol. 8/9. Rome (RM): Voci della rotaia.
- Giuseppe Barbella (March 2025). Uomini, soldati, eroi, vittime: angresi, racconti di un passato che non dobbiamo dimenticare [Men, soldiers, heroes, victims: Angresi, stories of a past that we must not forget] (in Italian). Illustrated by A.I. Lesmo (MB): Wood & Stein Editore. ISBN 9788890539640.
