= Boardwalk Empire season 1 =

Boardwalk Empire
- Season 1
- DVD cover
- No. of episodes: 12

Release
- Original network: HBO
- Original release: September 19 – December 5, 2010

Season chronology
- Next → Season 2

The first season of the HBO television series Boardwalk Empire premiered on September 19, 2010, and concluded on December 5, 2010, consisting of 12 episodes. The series was created by Terence Winter and based on the book Boardwalk Empire: The Birth, High Times and Corruption of Atlantic City by Nelson Johnson. Set in Atlantic City, New Jersey, during the Prohibition era, the series stars Steve Buscemi as Enoch "Nucky" Thompson (based on the historical Enoch L. Johnson), a political figure who rose to prominence and controlled Atlantic City, New Jersey, during the Prohibition period of the 1920s and 1930s. The first season takes place between January and November 1920, beginning with the start of national prohibition and ending with the 1920 presidential election.

The first episode, with a final cost of $18 million, was directed by Martin Scorsese and was the most expensive pilot episode produced in television history.

The first season was met with widespread praise, particularly for its visual style and historical accuracy. On the review aggregator website Metacritic, the first season scored 88/100 based on 30 reviews, indicating "universal acclaim". The American Film Institute named Boardwalk Empire one of the ten "best television programs of the year".

== Cast ==
=== Main ===
- Steve Buscemi as Enoch "Nucky" Thompson, the treasurer of Atlantic County, New Jersey while also secretly a part-time bootlegger.
- Michael Pitt as James "Jimmy" Darmody, Nucky's impatient protege who wants to play a larger role in his empire. Jimmy is also a WW1 veteran who is scarred by events from his past.
- Kelly Macdonald as Margaret Schroeder, an abused housewife and member of the Women's Temperance League who later becomes Nucky's love interest.
- Michael Shannon as Nelson Van Alden, a religious FBI agent investigating bootlegging and prohibition in Atlantic City who is also at odds with Nucky and Jimmy.
- Shea Whigham as Elias "Eli" Thompson, Nucky's younger brother and the Sheriff of Atlantic City who yearns to get out of his shadow.
- Aleksa Palladino as Angela Darmody, Jimmy's wife, an aspiring artist who wants to be an independent woman.
- Michael Stuhlbarg as Arnold Rothstein, a famous gambler and gangster who is Nucky's rival in the bootlegging business.
- Stephen Graham as Al Capone, Johnny Torrio's protege eager to rise in the ranks of the Chicago Outfit.
- Vincent Piazza as Charlie Luciano, Rothstein's scheming and hot-headed protege who helps him in the battle with Nucky.
- Paz de la Huerta as Lucy Danziger, Nucky's mistress who he later dumps for Margaret.
- Michael Kenneth Williams as Albert "Chalky" White, a black gangster, leader of Atlantic City's Black community, Nucky's business partner and owner of one of his warehouses.
- Anthony Laciura as Eddie Kessler, Nucky's German butler who is the target of most of his anger and verbal abuse.
- Paul Sparks as Michael "Mickey Doyle" Kozik, a Polish-American bootlegger who schemes against Nucky after his warehouse is given to Chalky.
- Dabney Coleman as Commodore Louis Kaestner, the former "King" of Atlantic City and Nucky's mentor.

=== Recurring ===
- Brady and Connor Noon as Tommy Darmody, Jimmy and Angela's young son
- Josie and Lucy Gallina as Emily Schroeder, Hans and Margaret's young daughter and Teddy's younger sister
- Declan and Rory McTigue as Teddy Schroeder, Emily's older brother and Margaret and Hans's son
- William Hill as Alderman George O'Neill, one of Nucky's henchmen in his political machine.
- Robert Clohessy as Alderman Jim Neary, one of Nucky's henchmen in his political machine.
- Gretchen Mol as Gillian Darmody, Jimmy's mother, Angela's mother-in-law and Tommy's grandmother who has a past history with Nucky.
- Adam Mucci as Deputy Halloran, Eli's second-in-command officer secretly wanting to be sheriff.
- Erik Weiner as Agent Sebso, Van Alden's FBI partner and second-in-command.
- Greg Antonacci as Johnny Torrio, Al Capone's mentor, Colosimo's former protege and the leader of the Chicago Outfit.
- Edoardo Ballerini as Ignatius D'Alessio, one of the 6 D'Alessio Brothers from Philadelphia recruited by Rothstein and Luciano to help them kill Nucky and Jimmy.
- Max Casella as Leo D'Alessio, one of the 6 D'Alessio Brothers from Philadelphia recruited by Rothstein and Luciano to help them kill Nucky and Jimmy.
- Peter McRobbie as Supervisor Frederick Elliot, Van Alden's FBI superior wanting him to quickly finish the Nucky Thompson investigation.
- Jack Huston as Richard Harrow, a WW1 war veteran and former sniper who later becomes Jimmy's best friend and right hand-man in Chicago and Atlantic City.
- Anna Katarina as Isabelle Jeunet, the owner of a silk shop in the boardwalk who is also Margaret's boss.
- Megan Reinking as Annabelle, Nucky's former mistress before he dumped her for Lucy who befriends Margaret.
- Kevin O'Rourke as Edward L. Bader, an up-and-coming businessman and politician who later becomes the Mayor of Atlantic City.
- Anatol Yusef as Meyer Lansky, Luciano's friend and Rothstein's other protege who joins them in getting rid of Nucky and Jimmy.
- Tom Aldredge as Ethan Thompson, Nucky and Eli's abusive father who is now a sick and elderly man.
- Stephen DeRosa as Eddie Cantor, a comedian and friend of Nucky's.
- Pearce Bunting as Bill McCoy, a rum-running ship captain and bootlegger who is partners with Nucky.
- Emily Meade as Pearl, a prostitute working at the Four Deuces in Chicago for Colosimo, later Torrio and Capone.
- Geoff Pierson as Walter Edge, an Atlantic City politician and associate of Nucky's.
- Joseph Riccobene as Frankie Yale, a gangster and associate of Capone and Torrio and later Luciano and Rothstein.
- Joe Caniano as Jake Guzik, Capone's friend and Torrio's associate who helps in the Four Deuces.
- Christopher McDonald as Harry Daugherty, a politician helping Nucky with electing Warren G. Harding as president.

== Production ==
=== Development ===
Terence Winter, who had served as executive producer and writer on the HBO series The Sopranos, was hired to adapt the novel Boardwalk Empire on June 4, 2008. Winter had been interested in creating a series set in the 1920s, feeling that it had never properly been explored before. It was for this reason that he decided to focus his adaption of the novel on the Prohibition era section. On September 1, 2009, it was announced that Academy Award-winning director Martin Scorsese would direct the pilot. It would be the first time he had directed an episode of television since an episode of Steven Spielberg's Amazing Stories in 1986. The production would be very ambitious, with some even speculating it would be too large scale for television. "I kept thinking 'This is pointless. How can we possibly afford a boardwalk, or an empire?'" said Winter. "We can't call it 'Boardwalk Empire' and not see a boardwalk." The production would eventually build a 300-foot-long (91 m) boardwalk in an empty lot in Brooklyn, New York at the cost of five million dollars. Despite a reported budget of up to $50 million, the pilot's final budget came in at $18 million.

On why he chose to return to television, Scorsese said "What's happening the past 9 to 10 years, particularly at HBO, is what we had hoped for in the mid-Sixties with films being made for television at first. We'd hoped there would be this kind of freedom and also the ability to create another world and create longform characters and story. That didn't happen in the 1970s, 1980s and in the 1990s I think. And of course ...HBO is a trailblazer in this. I've been tempted over the years to be involved with them because of the nature of long-form and their development of character and plot." He went on to praise network HBO by saying, "A number of the episodes, in so many of their series, they're thoughtful, intelligent [and] brilliantly put together... It's a new opportunity for storytelling. It's very different from television of the past."

=== Casting ===
"Scorsese is an actor magnet," commented Winter. "Everybody wants to work with him. I had all these pictures on my wall and I thought, 'I'd really better write some good stuff for these people.'" In casting the role of Nucky Thompson (based upon real-life Atlantic City political boss Enoch L. Johnson), Winter wanted to stray from the real life Johnson as much as possible. "If we were going to cast accurately what the real Nucky looked like, we'd have cast Jim Gandolfini." The idea of casting Steve Buscemi in the lead role came about when Scorsese mentioned wanting to work with the actor, whom Winter knew well having worked with him on The Sopranos. Winter sent the script out to Buscemi, who responded very enthusiastically. "I just thought, 'Wow. I'm almost sorry I've read this, because if I don't get it, I'm going to be so sad.' My response was 'Terry, I know you're looking at other actors'... and he said, 'No, no, Steve, I said we want you.'" Explained Scorsese, "I love the range he has, his dramatic sense, but also his sense of humor."

The casting of Buscemi was soon followed by Michael Pitt, best known for his roles in the Sandra Bullock film Murder by Numbers and in the television series Dawson's Creek. He was soon joined by Kelly Macdonald, Vincent Piazza and Michael Shannon, who had just received an Oscar nomination for his role in the Sam Mendes film Revolutionary Road.

=== Filming ===
Filming for the pilot took place at various locations in and around New York City in June 2009. In creating the visual effects for the series, the company turned to Brooklyn-based effects company Brainstorm Digital. Says Glenn Allen, visual effects producer for Boardwalk Empire and co-founder of Brainstorm, "It's our most complex job to date. Everything is HD now, so we have to treat it like a feature film." "Anytime you get to work on a period piece, it's more fun," comments visual effects artist Chris "Pinkus" Wesselman, who used archival photographs, postcards, and architectural plans to recreate the Atlantic City boardwalks as accurately as possible. "We got to explore what the old Atlantic City was really like. The piers were one of the toughest parts because every summer they would change—new houses, new advertisements." It took two months for the firm to complete all the visual effects for the pilot.

=== Costume design ===
Designed by John Dunn and tailored by Martin Greenfield, Boardwalk Empire's costumes were based on 1920s tailoring books from the Fashion Institute of Technology's research libraries and examples found at the Brooklyn Museum and the Met. The costumes have also been rented from the Daybreak Vintage Company located in Albany, NY which also exhibits at the Manhattan Vintage Clothing Show. Dunn's designs were meticulously detailed, including a collar pin for Nucky's shirts and even going so far as to incorporate specially ordered woolens for suiting. Dunn told Esquire magazine in a September 2010 interview, "With Marty and Terry Winters, I developed the feel for each of the characters. We all wanted it to be very, very accurate and specific to the period.... I don't like to do boring clothing, but you also have to make sure that you're not suddenly putting somebody in something that isn't going to make sense four episodes from now." These tailors were supplied by textile importer HMS fabrics and Gladstone ltd.

=== Martin Scorsese's contribution ===
Martin Scorsese was involved in the filming even before creator Terence Winter. He directed the pilot and established the look of the show, which other directors later emulated to make the show feel seamless. He is also one of the executive producers of the show. Winter stated that Scorsese weighs in on the casting decisions, watches all the cuts and dailies. Up until the shooting of the show's first season, Scorsese and Winter would meet every Sunday afternoon to review what went on during the week where Scorsese would have comments and suggestions. Scorsese continued to be creatively involved in the ongoing production, but did not direct any more episodes.

== Episodes ==
No. overall	No. in season	Title	Directed by	Written by	Original release date	US viewers (millions)
1	1	"Boardwalk Empire"	Martin Scorsese	Terence Winter	September 19, 2010	4.81
At the dawn of Prohibition in January 1920, Enoch "Nucky" Thompson, treasurer of Atlantic County, hatches a scheme to make himself and his associates very rich by bootlegging liquor, entering into business with Arnold Rothstein and Charlie "Lucky" Luciano. Nucky is approached by beautiful and pregnant Margaret Schroeder, who wants his help finding her abusive husband a job. Jimmy Darmody, Nucky's former protégé, returns from fighting in World War I with ambitious ideas about his future and he forges an unlikely alliance that could have serious consequences for both him and Nucky.
2	2	"The Ivory Tower"	Tim Van Patten	Terence Winter	September 26, 2010	3.33
Nucky is paid a visit by straight-arrow Agent Nelson Van Alden, who feels that Nucky has pinned a crime on a scapegoat. After using his recent windfall to buy presents for his wife Angela and mother Gillian, Jimmy is forced to pay Nucky a larger sum of money. Margaret is visited by both Van Alden and Nucky's brother, Sheriff Elias Thompson, each seeking a different side of her story as to the death of her husband. After the funeral of James "Big Jim" Colosimo, Chicago gangster Al Capone has a violent encounter with an inquisitive reporter. Nucky contemplates the upcoming election with his aging mentor, Louis "the Commodore" Kaestner.
3	3	"Broadway Limited"	Tim Van Patten	Margaret Nagle	October 3, 2010	3.41
Nucky makes a deal with African-American gangster Chalky White to handle the repackaging and distribution of bootlegged whiskey, a decision that quickly turns deadly for Chalky's gang. Margaret is given a job at a boutique through Nucky's connections, and crosses paths with his mistress Lucy. Agent Van Alden learns through a brutal interrogation that Jimmy was involved in the shooting in the woods, a discovery that forces Nucky to make a decision on Jimmy's future in Atlantic City.
4	4	"Anastasia"	Jeremy Podeswa	Lawrence Konner & Margaret Nagle	October 10, 2010	2.57
Nucky celebrates his birthday and uses the event to try and expand his influence over both the Mayor of Jersey City and a United States Senator. Margaret is tasked with delivering a dress to Lucy, and finds solace from her disillusionment by shoplifting lingerie. Chalky exacts revenge on a local Ku Klux Klan leader for a lynching. Jimmy and Capone expand their business operations by taking over territories from a local Irish gangster, resulting in vicious consequences for Pearl, a prostitute Jimmy was fond of. Luciano takes an interest in Gillian while tracking down Jimmy at Rothstein's request.
5	5	"Nights in Ballygran"	Alan Taylor	Lawrence Konner	October 17, 2010	2.85
Nucky prepares for St. Patrick's Day, but finds himself at odds with an increasingly antagonistic Eli. The attack on Pearl has devastating consequences for both her and Jimmy. Gillian proposes to Angela, the mother of Jimmy's son, that she take over raising the child. Margaret, feeling slighted by Nucky, passes information to Agent Van Alden that disrupts both his business partnerships and the annual Celtic Dinner – a decision which leads to a tense late-night encounter between the two.
6	6	"Family Limitation"	Tim Van Patten	Howard Korder	October 24, 2010	2.81
Nucky investigates a boardwalk theft against one of his ward bosses, which leads him to directly confront Luciano – who has been conducting an affair with Gillian. Margaret embraces her new role as Nucky's mistress, which gives her the nerve to stand up to Lucy. Jimmy scores points with Johnny Torrio and antagonizes Capone in Chicago with his definitive solution to the Sheridan gang dispute. Van Alden struggles with his superior's instructions and his growing obsession with Margaret.
7	7	"Home"	Allen Coulter	Tim Van Patten & Paul Simms	October 31, 2010	2.67
Nucky purges some painful childhood memories with the upcoming sale of his father's home. Jimmy forms an alliance with Richard Harrow, a former Army sniper heavily scarred in the war, which allows him to find justice against the man who disfigured Pearl. Luciano and Rothstein protégé Meyer Lansky enters into an alliance with the D'Alessio brothers to set up a new bootlegging business, bankrolled by robbing Nucky's business ventures. Angela Darmody pursues a new love affair, while Lucy and the Commodore both grow agitated with Nucky's lack of attention.
8	8	"Hold Me in Paradise"	Brian Kirk	Meg Jackson	November 7, 2010	3.21
Nucky visits Chicago for the Republican National Convention, where he finds himself intrigued by the candidacy of Warren G. Harding over more established candidates. The D'Alessio gang moves in on Nucky's territory at the expense of Eli, who has been watching over his brother's affairs. Margaret finds herself entangled in Nucky's business, while Van Alden struggles with his wife's desire for a child. Rothstein prepares for legal trouble over his role in fixing the 1919 World Series. Nucky asks Jimmy to return to Atlantic City to reinforce his position.
9	9	"Belle Femme"	Brad Anderson	Steve Kornacki	November 14, 2010	2.98
Nucky is forced to readjust his political alliances because of a Democratic mayoral candidate promising to wipe out corruption. Jimmy returns from Chicago to deal with the D'Alessio gang, which has allied with Rothstein to import Scotch from Europe through Atlantic City, but is arrested by Agent Van Alden for the massacre in the woods. Margaret intercedes with Nucky on Madame Jeunet's behalf, while Angela finds her romantic and artistic ambitions halted by Jimmy's return.
10	10	"The Emerald City"	Simon Cellan Jones	Lawrence Konner	November 21, 2010	3.05
Nucky asks for Margaret's assistance in backing his mayoral candidate with the passage of women's right to vote, leaving her conflicted about her expanding role as his mistress. Doyle switches sides back from Rothstein to Nucky, which leads him to conspire with Chalky against Lansky and the D'Alessios. Angela witnesses Jimmy's violent side against her photographer friend, and plans a better future with his wife. Van Alden grapples with his emotions, and has forceful encounters with both Margaret and Lucy.
11	11	"Paris Green"	Allen Coulter	Howard Korder	November 28, 2010	3.00
Nucky has emotionally charged conversations with both Margaret and Eli over his business and the killing of Margaret's husband, leading to dramatic shake-ups in his personal and political lives. Jimmy meets with his dying father for the first time in years, and in the process reevaluates his relationships with Nucky and both his parents. Van Alden and Agent Sebso's working relationship is pushed to the limit by Van Alden's suspicions, ending after a definitive confrontation at a river baptism. Angela prepares to flee from Jimmy to Paris, but learns her support system is not as strong as she believed.
12	12	"A Return to Normalcy"	Tim Van Patten	Terence Winter	December 5, 2010	3.29
Nucky faces Election Day in Atlantic City and pulls out all the stops to keep power in Republican hands. Torrio brokers a discussion between Nucky and Rothstein to resolve their growing gang war, as well as Rothstein's looming federal indictment over the World Series. Both Jimmy and Eli voice their growing resentment towards Nucky, and find they have an ally in the equally embittered Commodore. Van Alden seeks a sign on whether or not to leave Atlantic City, but receives unexpected news from Lucy. Margaret weighs new information about Nucky's first marriage and her uncertain future to make a final decision on her role in his life.

== Reception ==
=== Critical reception ===
The first season of Boardwalk Empire received overwhelmingly positive reviews from critics. On the review aggregator website Metacritic, the first season scored 88 out of 100 based on 31 reviews. The American Film Institute named Boardwalk Empire one of the ten "best television programs of the year". Another aggregator website, Rotten Tomatoes, gave the first season a 94% rating, based on 67 critics’ reviews with an average score of 8.4/10, with the site consensus stating "Thought-provoking, violent, and filled with lush period detail, Boardwalk Empire is a gangster drama of uncommon depth and scope."

David Hinkley of the New York Daily News awarded the series five out of five, saying "Watching HBO's new 'Boardwalk Empire' is like sitting in your favorite tavern and hearing someone say, 'Drinks are on the house.' Friends, it does not get much better." Paige Wiser of the Chicago Sun-Times called it "... an event not to be missed", and praised Buscemi in particular, calling his performance "fascinating". TV Guide's Matt Roush praised the marriage of Scorsese and Winter, saying it "... brilliantly marries Martin Scorsese's virtuosic cinematic eye to Terence Winter's panoramic mastery of rich character and eventful story", and finished his review by stating "It's the most purely—and impurely—enjoyable storytelling HBO has delivered in ages, like a movie that you never want to end." Variety's Brian Lowry praised the show for returning network HBO to top form, saying "This is, quite simply, television at its finest, occupying a sweet spot that—for all the able competition—still remains unique to HBO: An expensive, explicit, character-driven program, tackling material no broadcast network or movie studio would dare touch ... For those wondering when the channel would deliver another franchise to definitively put it on top of the world, Ma, the wait is over: Go directly to 'Boardwalk.'" "One of the unexpected joys of 'Boardwalk Empire,' though, lies in the way the show revels in the oddities of its time, peeling back the layers of polite society to reveal a giddy shadow world of criminals and politicians collaborating to keep the liquor flowing", says online magazine Salon's Heather Havrilesky who went on to call the pilot "breathtaking". Roberto Bianco from USA Today said in his review that Boardwalk Empire was "Extravagantly produced, shockingly violent and as cold and hard as ice, Boardwalk Empire brings us back to the world's former playground at the start of Prohibition—and brings HBO back to the forefront of the TV-series race."

=== Awards and nominations ===
On July 14, 2011 Boardwalk Empire was nominated for 18 Emmy Awards that included Outstanding Drama Series, Outstanding Lead Actor in a Drama Series (Steve Buscemi) and Outstanding Supporting Actress in a Drama Series (Kelly Macdonald).

Boardwalk Empire won a Writers Guild of America Award for Best Writing in a New Series and was nominated for Best Writing in a Drama Series. In addition, the show won a Golden Globe for best Dramatic Series, Buscemi won Best Actor in Dramatic Series and MacDonald was nominated for Best Supporting Actress in a Series, Miniseries or Motion Picture Made for Television. The cast won the Screen Actor's Guild Award for Best Ensemble in a Drama Series, while Steve Buscemi won the Screen Actor's Guild Award for Outstanding Performance by a Male Actor in a Drama Series and Martin Scorsese won the Directors Guild Award for Outstanding Directorial Achievement in Dramatic Series. Boardwalk Empire was in The American Film Institute's Top Ten List for TV in 2010.

Boardwalk Empire also won two awards at the 9th Annual Visual Effects Society Awards. The first for "Outstanding Supporting Visual Effects in a Broadcast Program" and second for "Outstanding Models & Miniatures in a Broadcast Program or Commercial". The former was received by Richard Friedlander (of Brainstorm Digital), Robert Stromberg, Paul Graff and David Taritero; the latter was received by Brendan Fitzgerald, John Corbett and Matthew Conner of Brainstorm Digital.

=== Ratings ===
On its original airing, the pilot episode gained a 2.0/5 ratings share among adults aged 18–49 and garnered 4.81 million viewers. The episode was re-played twice that night, once at 10:15 p.m. and again at 11:30 p.m. Taking these broadcasts into account, a total of 7.1 million Americans viewed the episode on the night of its original broadcast, and is the highest rated premiere for an HBO series since the pilot of Deadwood in March 2004. The season finale was watched by 3.29 million viewers, attaining a 1.3 adults 18–49 rating.

== Home media releases ==
The first season was released on Blu-ray and DVD in region 1 on January 10, 2012, in region 2 on January 9, 2012, and in region 4 on January 11, 2012.

Special features include:

- Enhanced Viewing (BD only) – Learn more about the production process and historical background from A.C. historians
- Making Boardwalk Empire – Behind-the-scenes look at the set, featuring interviews from the cast and crew
- Character Dossier – Comprehensive character guide
- Creating the Boardwalk – Learn how the actual Boardwalk set was created
- Atlantic City: The Original Sin City – 30-minute documentary on the culture and social climate of A.C. at the time
- Speakeasy Tour – A look at famed Prohibition speakeasies in Chicago and New York
- Audio Commentaries – Six audio commentaries from various cast and crew
