= List of awards and nominations received by Boardwalk Empire =

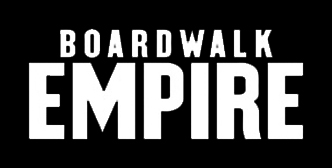

This is the list of awards and nominations received by the television series Boardwalk Empire.

== Emmy Awards ==
=== Primetime Emmy Awards ===
Year	Category	Nominee(s)	Episode(s)	Result
2011	Outstanding Drama Series	Terence Winter, Martin Scorsese, Mark Wahlberg, Stephen Levinson, Tim Van Patten, Eugene Kelly, Lawrence Konner, Howard Korder, Margaret Nagle, Rick Yorn, Rudd Simmons	"Boardwalk Empire", "Anastasia", "Nights in Ballygran", "Family Limitation", "Paris Green", "A Return to Normalcy"	Nominated
2011	Outstanding Directing in a Drama Series	Martin Scorsese	"Boardwalk Empire"	Won
2011	Outstanding Directing in a Drama Series	Jeremy Podeswa	"Anastasia"	Nominated
2011	Outstanding Lead Actor in a Drama Series	Steve Buscemi	"A Return to Normalcy"	Nominated
2011	Outstanding Supporting Actress in a Drama Series	Kelly Macdonald	"Family Limitation"	Nominated
2012	Outstanding Drama Series	Terence Winter, Martin Scorsese, Mark Wahlberg, Stephen Levinson, Tim Van Patten, Eugene Kelly, Howard Korder, Rick Yorn, Joe Iberti	"21", "Ourselves Alone", "Peg of Old", "Two Boats and a Lifeguard", "Under God's Power She Flourishes", "To the Lost"	Nominated
2012	Outstanding Directing in a Drama Series	Tim Van Patten	"To the Lost"	Won
2012	Outstanding Lead Actor in a Drama Series	Steve Buscemi	"Two Boats and a Lifeguard"	Nominated
2013	Outstanding Directing in a Drama Series	Tim Van Patten	"Margate Sands"	Nominated
2013	Outstanding Supporting Actor in a Drama Series	Bobby Cannavale	"Sunday Best"	Won
2014	Outstanding Directing in a Drama Series	Tim Van Patten	"Farewell Daddy Blues"	Nominated
2015	Outstanding Directing in a Drama Series	Tim Van Patten	"Eldorado"	Nominated

=== Creative Arts Emmy Awards ===
Year	Category	Nominee(s)	Episode	Result
2011	Outstanding Casting for a Drama Series	Ellen Lewis and Meredith Tucker		Won
2011	Outstanding Single-Camera Picture Editing for a Drama Series		"Boardwalk Empire"	Won
2011	Outstanding Cinematography for a Single-Camera Series		"Boardwalk Empire"	Nominated
2011	Outstanding Cinematography for a Single-Camera Series		"Home"	Won
2011	Outstanding Cinematography for a Single-Camera Series		"A Return to Normalcy"	Nominated
2011	Outstanding Main Title Design			Nominated
2011	Outstanding Costumes for a Series		"Anastasia"	Nominated
2011	Outstanding Art Direction for a Single-Camera Series		"Boardwalk Empire"	Won
2011	Outstanding Make-up for a Single-Camera Series (Non-Prosthetic)		"Boardwalk Empire"	Won
2011	Outstanding Hairstyling for a Single-Camera Series		"Boardwalk Empire"	Nominated
2011	Outstanding Sound Editing for a Series		"Boardwalk Empire"	Won
2011	Outstanding Sound Mixing for a Comedy or Drama Series (One Hour)		"Boardwalk Empire"	Nominated
2011	Outstanding Special Visual Effects		"Boardwalk Empire"	Won
2012	Outstanding Casting for a Drama Series			Nominated
2012	Outstanding Cinematography for a Single-Camera Series		"21"	Won
2012	Outstanding Sound Editing for a Series		"Gimcrack & Bunkum"	Nominated
2012	Outstanding Costumes for a Series		"21"	Nominated
2012	Outstanding Art Direction for a Single-Camera Series		"Peg of Old", "Battle of the Century", "To the Lost"	Won
2012	Outstanding Make-up for a Single-Camera Series (Non-Prosthetic)		"Georgia Peaches"	Nominated
2012	Outstanding Prosthetic Make-up for a Series, Miniseries, Movie, or Special		"The Age of Reason"	Nominated
2012	Outstanding Hairstyling for a Single-Camera Series		"Two Boats and a Lifeguard"	Nominated
2012	Outstanding Special Visual Effects in a Supporting Role		"Georgia Peaches"	Won
2013	Outstanding Cinematography for a Single-Camera Series		"Margate Sands"	Nominated
2013	Outstanding Sound Editing for a Series		""The Milkmaid's Lot""	Won
2013	Outstanding Sound Mixing for a Comedy or Drama Series (One Hour)		""The Milkmaid's Lot""	Won
2013	Outstanding Costumes for a Series		"Resolution"	Nominated
2013	Outstanding Art Direction for a Single-Camera Series		"Sunday Best", "Two Impostors" and Margate Sands"	Won
2013	Outstanding Make-up for a Single-Camera Series (Non-Prosthetic)		"Resolution"	Nominated
2013	Outstanding Hairstyling for a Single-Camera Series		"Resolution"	Won
2013	Outstanding Special Visual Effects in a Supporting Role		"The Pony"	Nominated
2014	Outstanding Sound Editing for a Series		"White Horse Pike"	Nominated
2014	Outstanding Costumes for a Series		"New York Sour"	Nominated
2014	Outstanding Art Direction for a Period Series, Miniseries or a Movie (Single-Camera)		"Erlkönig"; "The Old Ship of Zion"; "Farewell Daddy Blues"	Won
2014	Outstanding Make-up for a Single-Camera Series (Non-Prosthetic)		"New York Sour"	Nominated
2014	Outstanding Hairstyling for a Single-Camera Series		"William Wilson"	Nominated
2014	Outstanding Prosthetic Make-up for a Series, Miniseries, Movie or A Special		"William Wilson"	Nominated
2015	Outstanding Cinematography for a Single-Camera Series	Jonathan Freeman	"Golden Days for Boys and Girls"	Won
2015	Outstanding Costumes for a Period / Fantasy Series, Limited Series, or Movie		"Golden Days for Boys and Girls"	Nominated
2015	Outstanding Hairstyling for a Single-Camera Series		"Eldorado"	Nominated
2015	Outstanding Make-up for a Single-Camera Series (Non-Prosthetic)		"What Jesus Said"	Nominated
2015	Outstanding Prosthetic Make-up for a Series, Limited Series, Movie, or Special		"The Good Listener	Nominated
2015	Outstanding Art Direction for a Period Series, Miniseries or a Movie (Single-Camera)		"Golden Days for Boys and Girls"; "Friendless Child"; "Eldorado"	Won
2015	Outstanding Sound Editing for a Series		"The Good Listener"	Nominated
2015	Outstanding Special Visual Effects in a Supporting Role		"Golden Days for Boys and Girls"	Nominated
2015	Outstanding Stunt Coordination for a Drama Series, Limited Series, or Movie	Christopher Place		Nominated

== Directors Guild of America Award ==
Year	Category	Nominee(s)	Episode	Result
2011	Outstanding Directorial Achievement in Dramatic Series	Martin Scorsese	"Boardwalk Empire"	Won
2011	Outstanding Directorial Achievement in Dramatic Series	Allen Coulter	"Paris Green"	Nominated

== Golden Globe Awards ==
Year	Category	Nominee(s)	Result
2011	Best Television Series – Drama		Won
2011	Best Performance by an Actor In A Television Series – Drama	Steve Buscemi	Won
2011	Best Supporting Actress – Series, Miniseries or Television Film	Kelly Macdonald	Nominated
2012	Best Television Series – Drama		Nominated
2012	Best Performance by an Actor In A Television Series – Drama	Steve Buscemi	Nominated
2012	Best Supporting Actress – Series, Miniseries or Television Film	Kelly Macdonald	Nominated
2013	Best Television Series – Drama		Nominated
2013	Best Performance by an Actor In A Television Series – Drama	Steve Buscemi	Nominated

== Location Managers Guild of America Awards ==
Year	Category	Nominee(s)	Result
2015	Outstanding Locations in a Period Television Series	Amanda Burbank and Audra Gorman	Won

== Screen Actors Guild Awards ==
Year	Category	Nominee(s)	Result
2011	Outstanding Performance by an Ensemble in a Drama Series		Won
2011	Outstanding Performance by a Male Actor in a Drama Series	Steve Buscemi	Won
2012	Outstanding Performance by an Ensemble in a Drama Series		Won
2012	Outstanding Performance by a Male Actor in a Drama Series	Steve Buscemi	Won
2013	Outstanding Performance by an Ensemble in a Drama Series		Nominated
2013	Outstanding Performance by a Male Actor in a Drama Series	Steve Buscemi	Nominated
2014	Outstanding Performance by an Ensemble in a Drama Series		Nominated
2014	Outstanding Performance by a Male Actor in a Drama Series	Steve Buscemi	Nominated
2014	Outstanding Performance by a Stunt Ensemble in a Television Series		Nominated

== Visual Effects Society Awards ==
Year	Category	Nominee(s)	Episode	Result
2011	Outstanding Supporting Visual Effects in a Broadcast Program	Robert Stromberg, Dave Taritero, Richard Friedlander, Paul Graff		Won
2011	Outstanding Created Environment in a Broadcast Program or Commercial	Robert Stromberg, Paul Graff, Brian Sales, Brian Pace	"Boardwalk"	Nominated
2011	Outstanding Created Environment in a Broadcast Program or Commercial	J. John Corbett, Matthew Conner, Brendan Fitzgerald, Jun Zhang	"Family Limitation"	Nominated
2011	Outstanding Models in a Broadcast Program or Commercial	J. John Corbett, Matthew Conner, Brendan Fitzgerald	"The Ivory Tower"	Won
2011	Outstanding Compositing in a Broadcast Program or Commercial	Paul Graff, Brian Sales, Jesse Siglow, Merysa Nichols	"Boardwalk Empire"	Nominated
2012	Outstanding Supporting Visual Effects in a Broadcast Program	Richard Friedlander, Robert Stromberg, David Taritero	"Georgia Peaches"	Nominated
2012	Outstanding Compositing in a Broadcast Program or Commercial	Anton Dawson, Eran Dinur, Austin Meyers, David Reynolds	"Gimcrack & Bunkum"	Won
2012	Outstanding Created Environment in a Broadcast Program or Commercial	Matthew Conner, Robert Stromberg	"Two Boats and a Lifeguard"	Nominated
2012	Outstanding Models in a Broadcast Program or Commercial	Matthew Conner, Eran Dinur, David Reynolds, Szymon Weglarski	"Georgia Peaches"	Won
2013	Outstanding Supporting Visual Effects in a Broadcast Program	John Bair, Parker Chehak, Paul Graff, Lesley Robson-Foster	"The Pony"	Won

== Writers Guild of America Awards ==
Year	Category	Nominee(s)	Episode	Result
2011	Best Dramatic Series			Nominated
2011	Best New Series			Won
2012	Best Dramatic Series			Nominated
2012	Best Episodic Drama	Itamar Moses	"A Dangerous Maid"	Nominated
2012	Best Episodic Drama	Bathsheba Doran	"The Age of Reason"	Nominated
2013	Best Dramatic Series			Nominated
