= The Emerald City (Boardwalk Empire) =

- Boardwalk Empire episode
- Jimmy watches Angela paint
- Episode no.: Season 1 Episode 10
- Directed by: Simon Cellan Jones
- Written by: Lawrence Konner
- Original air date: November 21, 2010
- Running time: 59 minutes

Guest appearances
- Greg Antonacci as Johnny Torrio; Max Casella as Leo D'Alessio; Josiah Early as Robert Dittrich; Jack Huston as Richard Harrow; Dana Ivey as Mrs. McGarry; Lisa Joyce as Mary Dittrich; Peter McRobbie as Supervisor Elliot; Erik Weiner as Agent Sebso; Anatol Yusef as Meyer Lansky

Episode chronology
← Previous "Belle Femme"	Next → "Paris Green"

"The Emerald City" is the tenth episode of the first season of the HBO television series Boardwalk Empire, which aired on HBO November 21, 2010. The episode was written by co-executive producer Lawrence Konner and directed by Simon Cellan Jones. The title is based on the fictional Emerald City from the Oz Books.

The episode deals with Nucky further involving Margaret in the corrupt affairs of his gang, Angela witnessing Jimmy's violent side as he struggles to adapt to a changing home environment, Capone maturing as a gangster, and Van Alden grappling with his emotions.

== Plot ==
In the aftermath of the assassination attempt on Nucky, Richard is assigned to guard his house; his scarred face and tin mask frighten Margaret and her children. Nucky tries to allay her apprehensions about living under guard, promising her that he has the situation well in hand. Van Alden's superiors at the Bureau of Prohibition dismiss his suspicions about the death of the witness and accept Sebso's false account of the killing, warning Van Alden that his career is finished if he embarrasses the Bureau again. Jimmy is released from jail for lack of evidence; he returns home and works at reconnecting with Angela and Tommy.

In New York, Rothstein meets with Mickey and the D'Alessio brothers. Valuing the power of accurate information, Rothstein reprimands the group for failing to account for Eddie's presence, wounding a civilian, and unintentionally revealing his plans to Nucky. He refuses to do any further business with them until they repay the cost of their mistake. Meanwhile, in Chicago, Torrio chastises Capone for interrupting an important meeting with a juvenile prank. While attending the bar mitzvah of the son of Torrio's beer supplier, Jake Guzik, Capone learns how the Jewish faith places great importance on men behaving responsibly and being held to account for their actions. Recognizing his own failings, he asks Torrio to give him a chance to prove he can contribute more to the bottom line. Torrio assigns Capone to oversee Guzik's mismanaged brewery.

As the Darmodys pass the photography shop on the Boardwalk during a family outing, Tommy points to a picture of Robert and Mary Dittrich and calls one of them Angela's "kissing friend", referring to Mary. Jimmy assumes otherwise and publicly beats Robert with his own camera tripod, prompting Angela to promise Mary she will leave Jimmy and move with Tommy and her to Paris. Margaret celebrates the passage of women's suffrage, but Nucky immediately pressures her to help rally new female voters in support of Bader's mayoral campaign. She finally gives in and makes a rousing, well-received speech, but sours when she sees Nucky gladhanding with other powerful men.

While reading The Road to Oz to her children, Margaret encourages Richard, whom she refers to as the "Tin Woodman", to sit with them. Later, as Richard proves himself adept at caring for the family, she confesses her shame at her prior mistreatment of him. Richard replies that because he himself has not moved past judging by appearances, he can hardly expect the same of others. He also notes that he sometimes forgets the changes he has undergone and is reminded only when he looks into a mirror and sees his face. Van Alden visits Margaret and, in a plea fraught with religious and romantic overtones, demands that she let him save her from damnation for participating in Nucky's life of crime. When she rejects him, he visits a speakeasy, where he takes shots of whisky and has drunken sex with Lucy.

Fearing for his life, Mickey betrays the D'Alessios to an enraged Nucky; he enlists Chalky to arrange a false deal with Lansky in the hopes of luring Rothstein's men into an ambush. When Lansky and two of the D'Alessios meet with Chalky, one of them mentions his Packard, a detail they could only know from seeing it when they killed Chalky's driver. After Chalky takes them prisoner, Nucky identifies one of the brothers as his would-be assassin; Jimmy shoots him in the head while Chalky personally strangles the other to death and has his men dump the bodies. Seeing that the original plan is ruined, Nucky releases Lansky and instructs him to tell Rothstein what has happened. Nucky returns home to Margaret, blaming his late return on a "campaign strategy meeting". The episode ends with Margaret looking in the mirror, contemplating the decisions she has made.

== First appearance ==
- Jake Guzik: A Jewish-American pimp and bootlegger working at the Four Deuces who is also a greaser and delivery man for the Chicago Outfit and a friend of Capone and Torrio.

== Deaths ==
- Lucien D'Alessio: Ignacious, Leo and Matteo's younger brother, Sixtus and Pius's older brother, a member of the D'Alessio criminal operation and an associate of Arnold Rothstein, Lucky Luciano and Mickey Doyle. He is shot to death by Jimmy Darmody after making boorish comments about him, Nucky and Chalky.
- Matteo D'Alessio: Ignacious and Leo's younger brother, Lucien, Sixtus and Pius's older brother, a member of the D'Alessio criminal operation and an associate of Arnold Rothstein, Lucky Luciano and Mickey Doyle. He is strangled and choked to death by Chalky White after he threatens him.

== Reception ==
=== Critical reception ===
IGN gave the episode a score of 8.5 calling it "Great" and said ""I don't control anyone, Margaret," Nucky says. "I'm more of an overseer." If "Emerald City" is any indication, how Nucky observes and participates in the events of Season One's final two episodes will involve more changes and more strategic bloodshed." The A.V. Club gave the episode a "B", describing it "For the first nine episodes of Boardwalk Empire, we've been getting a lot of introduction and backstory and a lot of exploration of the world of 1920, but only a little bit of forward movement on the plot that was set into motion back in episode one. Yes, we've seen Margaret blossom from an abused immigrant peasant to an increasingly assured political player and Jimmy go from being a small-time crook to a shrewd mobster, and we've seen a number of folks get shot. But we began this adventure with Nucky Thompson, Arnold Rothstein, and the agents of the United States government all at odds over the future of the booze biz, and their respective advantages haven't changed much since then. And not to be an alarmist, but after tonight's "The Emerald City", there are only two episodes remaining in the first season." Expanding on that, they said, "As mentioned, "The Emerald City" features a lot of scenes of powerful men dealing with underlings who may or may not be up to the responsibilities of their respective organizations. Even Arnold Rothstein has a rough time of it, trying to explain "the age of information" to a bunch of goons whose idea of sound business practice is to shoot a man in the street. But then that's what Boardwalk Empire is all about, isn't it? Or at least it's what keeps me fascinated by the show even when it occasionally annoys me. What is it that all these characters are engaged in: Is this business or crime? Or is it something in between—like politics."

=== Ratings ===
"The Emerald City" gained a tenth of a point in to a 1.3 adults 18–49 rating and added a handful of viewers, just topping 3 million and had an overall of 3.049 million viewers.
