= Paris Green (Boardwalk Empire) =

- Boardwalk Empire episode
- Richard tells Nucky that Margaret has disappeared, along with her children
- Episode no.: Season 1 Episode 11
- Directed by: Allen Coulter
- Written by: Howard Korder
- Original air date: November 28, 2010
- Running time: 56 minutes

Guest appearances
- Gretchen Mol as Gillian Darmody; Tom Aldredge as Ethan Thompson; Michael Badalucco as Harry Prince; Josiah Early as Robert Dittrich; Jack Huston as Richard Harrow; Lisa Joyce as Mary Dittrich; Erik Weiner as Agent Sebso

Episode chronology
| ← Previous "The Emerald City" | Next → "A Return to Normalcy" |

"Paris Green" is the 11th episode of the first season of the HBO television series Boardwalk Empire, which premiered November 28, 2010. The episode was written by supervising producer Howard Korder and directed by Allen Coulter.

The episode sees Van Alden exacting revenge for a botched investigation, Jimmy facing up to the dark secrets of his family, and Nucky making a decision that will forever change his relationship with Eli.

== Plot ==
Van Alden continues to question Sebso's lies about the witness' death, prompting Sebso to contact Nucky for advice. Nucky tells him about an illegal still on the outskirts of Atlantic City and suggests Sebso convince Van Alden to refocus his attention. As they look for the still, the two agents come upon a black church's river baptism, prompting Van Alden to shed tears. Sebso, who is Jewish, puts in for a transfer to Detroit and confronts Van Alden about his paranoia, hostility, and anti-Semitism. Exasperated in spite of his actual guilt, Sebso demands to know how he might earn back Van Alden's trust before leaving. In response, Van Alden brings him to the river and bullies the smaller man into being baptized. Driven into a religious frenzy by Sebso's refusal to "repent", Van Alden dunks him underwater repeatedly and ends up drowning him. He declares to the crowd that "divine justice" has been done, brandishes his gun, and calmly walks away.

Gillian asks Jimmy to visit the dying Commodore, his biological father, which he does only reluctantly. Jimmy notes that Gillian was only thirteen years old when he was born, making him a child of rape. The Commodore tries to mollify Jimmy by telling him that "the wrong man is running this town", implying that Jimmy should supplant Nucky, whom Gillian reveals was the one who brought her to the Commodore decades previously while serving as sheriff. Jimmy decides to stay with his father as he passes away. This decision proves crucial, as Jimmy is present when the attending doctor detects significant amounts of arsenic (Paris Green) while testing a hair sample. The Commodore begins to recover, and Jimmy confronts Gillian with an empty canister of Paris Green pigment that he found in the trash. He reassures her of his support, whatever her intentions, but she remains silent.

Rothstein is called to Chicago to face charges of his involvement in the Black Sox Scandal. The surviving D'Alessio brothers have gone into hiding, but Richard finds one of them staying with family members. The mild-mannered Richard somewhat ruthlessly suggests killing the family as a means of getting the surviving brothers to "stick their heads up," a tactic harkening back to his past as a sniper in World War I; Jimmy is undecided. Meanwhile, Angela prepares to leave town with Tommy and Mary, leaving a note for Jimmy. She goes to the photography studio only to find it empty, unaware that Robert became aware of Mary's plan and absconded with her. Distraught and helpless, Angela rushes home, only to find that Jimmy has already read the note. With their son in the room, neither mentions the note, and Jimmy seems determined to carry on as before.

Nucky continues to deal with the pressures of winning both the upcoming election and the gang war with the D'Alessio brothers. Meanwhile, the boyfriend of Margaret's friend Annabelle loses all his money in the original Ponzi scheme. When he flees with Annabelle's life savings, she offers to resume her old relationship with Nucky. Margaret catches them talking in his office and later argues with him, criticizing Nucky for involving her in his business, then insisting she ignore its unsavory realities. Nucky argues that Margaret's own choices have brought them together, none of which reflect well on her own character. Margaret levels her suspicions about Nucky's part in the death of Hans, which Nucky indirectly confirms by retorting that neither of them has or should have any regret about what happened to him.

Eli is furious that, by confirming Margaret's suspicions, Nucky has endangered them both. He insults Margaret, calling her a liability created by Nucky's selfishness and criticizing his hypocritical aversion to violence. After a heated argument, Nucky drops Eli from the Republican ticket in favor of Halloran, who has been angling to replace Eli as sheriff. He arrives at Margaret's place only to find that she and her children have already left, her whereabouts unknown. The last scene shows Nucky visiting a palm reader on the Boardwalk, while his butler Eddie looks on.

== First appearance ==
- Lemuel Cuffy: The African-American Deacon of Atlantic County's church who is also a member of Atlantic City's black community and a religious member of the black church over there.

== Death ==
- Eric Sebso: A Jewish FBI Agent who is Van Alden's junior partner in the investigation on mob bosses and a secretly corrupt agent working for Nucky. He is murdered by Van Alden by being forcefully drowned to death as he is getting baptized.

== Reception ==
=== Critical reception ===
IGN praised the episode, calling it "outstanding" and went on to say, "With his safety nets gone and his finger tightening around a trigger gunning for Rothstein, Nucky is a man alone, surrounded by a war that can go any way but good. The future is uncertain, tension hangs and fans of the series are in the best position possible going in to what's sure to be a game-changing finale."

The A.V. Club gave the episode an A−.

=== Ratings ===
"Paris Green" slid two tenths of a point in to a 1.1 adults 18–49 rating, but had a nearly identical average viewership vs. last week. The episode had a total of 3.004 million viewers.
