= List of Boardwalk Empire characters =

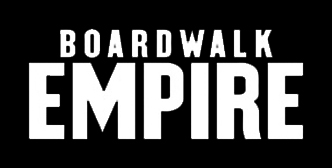

The following is a list of characters from the HBO television show Boardwalk Empire. The show dramatizes the Prohibition era in Atlantic City and the early history of the American Mafia. Many of the characters on the show are fictional, but some are (loosely) based on historical figures. Some characters use the name of the person upon which they are based, while others have had their names changed for the program.

== Cast ==
=== Main cast ===
Character	Actor	Seasons				
Character	Actor	1	2	3	4	5
Enoch "Nucky" Thompson	Steve Buscemi	Main	Main	Main	Main	Main
James "Jimmy" Darmody	Michael Pitt	Main	Main	Stand-in	Stand-in	
Margaret Thompson	Kelly Macdonald	Main	Main	Main	Main	Main
Nelson Van Alden / George Mueller	Michael Shannon	Main	Main	Main	Main	Main
Elias "Eli" Thompson	Shea Whigham	Main	Main	Main	Main	Main
Angela Darmody	Aleksa Palladino	Main	Main			
Arnold Rothstein	Michael Stuhlbarg	Main	Main	Main	Main	
Al Capone	Stephen Graham	Main	Main	Main	Main	Main
Charles "Lucky" Luciano	Vincent Piazza	Main	Main	Main	Main	Main
Lucy Danziger	Paz de la Huerta	Main	Main			
Albert "Chalky" White	Michael Kenneth Williams	Main	Main	Main	Main	Main
Edward "Eddie" Kessler	Anthony Laciura	Main	Main	Main	Main	
Mickey Doyle	Paul Sparks	Main	Main	Main	Main	Main
Commodore Louis Kaestner	Dabney Coleman	Main	Main			Recurring (Note: Louis Kaestner is portrayed by John Ellison Conlee in season 5.)
Richard Harrow	Jack Huston	Recurring	Main	Main	Main	
Gillian Darmody	Gretchen Mol	Recurring	Main	Main	Main	Main
Owen Sleater	Charlie Cox		Recurring	Main		
Gyp Rosetti	Bobby Canavale			Main		
Roy Phillips	Ron Livingston				Main	
Dr. Valentin Narcisse	Jeffrey Wright				Main	Main
William "Willie" Thompson	Ben Rosenfield			Recurring (Note: Willie Thompson is portrayed by Kevin Csolak in season 3.)	Recurring	Main

=== Recurring cast ===
Character	Actor	Seasons				
Character	Actor	1	2	3	4	5
Meyer Lansky	Anatol Yusef	Recurring	Recurring	Recurring	Recurring	Recurring
Johnny Torrio	Greg Antonacci	Recurring	Recurring	Recurring	Recurring	Recurring
Rose Van Alden	Enid Graham	Recurring	Recurring			
Ethan Thompson	Tom Aldredge	Recurring	Recurring			Recurring (Note: Ethan Thompson is portrayed by Ian Hart in season 5.)
Mrs. McGarry	Dana Ivey	Recurring				
Isabelle Jeunet	Anna Katarina	Recurring		Guest		
Louanne Pratt	Johnnie Mae	Recurring				
Agent Sebso	Erik Weiner	Recurring				
Mary Dittrich	Lisa Joyce	Recurring				
Pearl	Emily Meade	Recurring				
Edward Bader	Kevin O'Rourke	Recurring	Recurring	Recurring	Recurring	
James Neary	Robert Clohessy	Recurring	Recurring			
Harry Daugherty	Christopher McDonald	Guest	Recurring	Recurring		
Leander Cephas Whitlock	Dominic Chianese		Recurring (Note: Leander Cephas Whitlock is portrayed by Jordan Lage in season 5.)	Recurring	Recurring	Recurring
Esther Randolph	Julianne Nicholson		Recurring	Recurring	Guest	
Manny Horvitz	William Forsythe		Recurring	Guest		
Dunn Purnsley	Erik LaRay Harvey		Recurring	Recurring	Recurring	
George Remus	Glenn Fleshler		Recurring	Recurring	Guest	
Katy	Heather Lind		Recurring	Recurring		
Joe Masseria	Ivo Nandi		Guest	Recurring	Recurring	Guest
Billie Kent	Meg Chambers Steedle			Recurring		
Gaston Bullock Means	Stephen Root			Recurring	Recurring	
Andrew Mellon	James Cromwell			Recurring	Guest	
Julia Sagorsky	Wrenn Schmidt			Recurring	Recurring	
Sally Wheet	Patricia Arquette				Recurring	Recurring
Ralph Capone	Domenick Lombardozzi				Recurring	Recurring
Frank Capone	Morgan Spector				Recurring	
James "Jim" Tolliver	Brian Geraghty				Recurring	
Daughter Maitland	Margot Bingham				Recurring	Recurring
Arquimedes	Paul Calderon					Recurring
Tommy Darmody/Slim	Travis Tope					Recurring

== Main characters ==
=== Enoch "Nucky" Thompson ===
Enoch "Nucky" Thompson (Steve Buscemi) is the main protagonist of the series. He is the corrupt treasurer of Atlantic County and its most powerful political figure. The character is based on Enoch L. Johnson.

=== James "Jimmy" Darmody ===
James "Jimmy" Darmody (Michael Pitt) is the secondary protagonist and antagonist of the series and a main character in Seasons 1-2. He is a former Princeton student who served in World War I. After returning home, Jimmy is hired by Nucky Thompson as his driver. The character is based on Jimmy Boyd.

=== Margaret Thompson ===
Margaret Thompson (formerly Schroeder, née Rohan) (Kelly Macdonald) is a young Irish widow and mother who turns to Nucky for help, eventually becoming his lover and later his wife. The character is based on Florence Osbeck.

=== Nelson Van Alden / George Mueller ===
Nelson Van Alden / George Mueller (Michael Shannon) is one of the main characters of the series starting off as an antagonist in Season 1 and a supporting main character in Seasons 2-5. He is a former Prohibition agent on the run after the murder of his former partner. Under the alias George Mueller, he inadvertently gets caught up in the conflict between Dean O'Banion and Al Capone. The character is based on William Frank.

=== Elias "Eli" Thompson ===
Elias "Eli" Thompson (Shea Whigham) is a main supporting character throughout the series, being Nucky's younger brother and former sheriff of Atlantic County. The character is based on Alfred "Alf" Johnson.

=== Angela Darmody ===
Angela Darmody (Aleksa Palladino) is a main character in Seasons 1–2. She is Jimmy's wife and the mother of his young son.

An art student at Princeton University, Angela began a romance with Jimmy Darmody in 1916. After Jimmy beat up a professor who attempted to grope his mother, Gillian, he was expelled and enlisted in World War I, leaving a pregnant Angela behind in Atlantic City.

During the first season, Angela struggles with Jimmy's descent into organized crime and his increasingly violent behaviour. Feeling isolated, she resumes a romantic relationship with Mary Dittrich, a photographer's wife. The two women plan to flee to Paris with Angela's son, Tommy. However, Mary and her husband abruptly abandon Angela, leaving her trapped in Atlantic City as Jimmy discovers the nature of her affair.

In Season 2, Jimmy and Angela move into a beach house, in an attempt to normalize their family life. Angela befriends and begins an affair with a novelist named Louise. Their relationship is tragically cut short when Philadelphia gangster Manny Horvitz, seeking revenge against Jimmy, breaks into their home. Mistaking Louise for Jimmy, Manny shoots her in the shower before executing a devastated Angela to eliminate her as a witness. ("Georgia Peaches")

Angela's murder deeply traumatizes Jimmy, which leads to a violent confrontation where he kills his father, the Commodore. Following Jimmy's subsequent death, their son Tommy is raised by Gillian. To avenge Angela, Richard Harrow assassinates Manny Horvitz at a later point of time. ("Resolution")

=== Arnold Rothstein ===
Arnold Rothstein (Michael Stuhlbarg) is a main character in Seasons 1-4 and a recurring antagonist throughout the 4 seasons. He is a powerful and intelligent New York gangster who enters into business with Nucky and is based on the real-life historical figure of the same name.

=== Al Capone ===
Al Capone (Stephen Graham) is a main character throughout the series. He is a low-level Chicago gangster with ambitions of leading the Chicago mob and is based on the real-life historical figure of the same name.

=== Charles "Lucky" Luciano ===
Charles "Lucky" Luciano (Vincent Piazza) is a main supporting character in Seasons 1-4 and a main antagonist in Season 5. He is a Sicilian-American gangster and close associate of Rothstein based on the real-life historical figure of the same name.

=== Lucy Danziger ===
Lucy Danziger (Paz de la Huerta) is a main character in Seasons 1-2. She is Nucky's mistress and a former Ziegfeld Follies dancer.

In Season 1, Lucy is portrayed as Nucky's demanding and superficial mistress. As Nucky becomes increasingly infatuated with Margaret Schroeder, Lucy grows jealous and acts out erratically which culminates in public confrontations. Nucky ultimately ends their relationship in favour of Margaret, which leaving Lucy desperate and isolated. Lucy seduces the married Prohibition Agent Nelson Van Alden and becomes pregnant.

In Season 2, Lucy is seen living in miserable seclusion under Van Alden's strict control until she gives birth to a daughter. She is desperate to escape and secretly secures funds from Nucky. Lucy abandons the infant with Van Alden, and flees Atlantic City to pursue a role in the Broadway musical A Dangerous Maid. ("Peg of Old")

Lucy is referenced in later seasons as well. Eddie Kessler notes to Nucky's subsequent mistress that Lucy has been entirely forgotten ("You'd Be Surprised"). Years later, her daughter Abigail only vaguely knows that her biological mother was a "dancer" ("King of Norway").

=== Albert "Chalky" White ===
Albert "Chalky" White (Michael Kenneth Williams) is a main character throughout the series. He is Nucky's counterpart in Atlantic City's black community.

=== Edward "Eddie" Kessler ===
Edward "Eddie" Kessler (Anthony Laciura) is a main supporting character in Seasons 1-4. He is Nucky's German personal assistant and valet. The character is based on Louis Kessel.

=== Mickey Doyle ===
Mickey Doyle (Paul Sparks) is a main supporting character throughout the series. He is an Atlantic City bootlegger. The character is based on Mickey Duffy.

=== Louis Kaestner ===
Commodore Louis Kaestner (Dabney Coleman in Seasons 1-2, John Ellison Conlee in Season 5) is a main character in Seasons 1-2 and a recurring character in Season 5. He is Nucky's mentor and predecessor in Atlantic City, Jimmy's biological father. The character is based on Louis Kuehnle.

=== Richard Harrow ===
Richard Harrow (Jack Huston) is a recurring character in Season 1 and a main character in Seasons 2–4. He is a former Army marksman who allies with Jimmy and later Nucky. Disfigured during the war, he wears a mask over half of his face.

=== Gillian Darmody ===
Gillian Darmody (Gretchen Mol) is a main character throughout the series. She is Jimmy's mother and an old friend of Nucky's. She is also Luciano's former lover.

=== Owen Sleater ===
Owen Sleater (Charlie Cox) is a recurring character in Season 2 and a main supporting character in Season 3. He is an Irish immigrant and IRA member who has an affair with Margaret, while working his way up in Nucky's organization.

=== Gyp Rosetti ===
Gyp Rosetti (Bobby Cannavale) is the main antagonist of Season 3. He is a Sicilian gangster backed by Joe Masseria, who challenges Nucky.

=== Roy Phillips ===
Roy Phillips (Ron Livingston) is a main supporting character in Season 4. He is a wealthy out-of-town businessman and Piggly Wiggly executive who becomes involved with Gillian Darmody.

=== Dr. Valentin Narcisse ===
Dr. Valentin Narcisse (Jeffrey Wright) is a primary antagonist in Season 4 and a secondary antagonist in Season 5. He is a Harlem racketeer who challenges Chalky. The character is based on Casper Holstein.

=== William "Willie" Thompson ===
William "Willie" Thompson (Kevin Csolak in Season 3, Ben Rosenfield in Seasons 4-5) is a recurring character in Seasons 3-4 and a main supporting character in Season 5. He is Eli's oldest son and Nucky's nephew who becomes an assistant U.S. Attorney in New York City.

== Recurring characters ==
=== Introduced in season one ===
==== Meyer Lansky ====
Meyer Lansky (Anatol Yusef) is a recurring supporting character in Seasons 1-4 and a main co-antagonist alongside Luciano in Season 5. He is a young protégé of Rothstein and partners with Luciano. The character is based on Meyer Lansky.

==== Johnny Torrio ====
Johnny Torrio (Greg Antonacci) is a recurring character in Seasons 1-4 and a secondary antagonist in Season 5 based on the real-life historical figure of the same name. He is Capone's boss in Chicago.

==== Rose Van Alden ====
Rose Van Alden (Enid Graham) is a recurring character in Seasons 1-2. She is Nelson's ex-wife who is infertile.

==== June Thompson ====
June Thompson (Nisi Sturgis) is a recurring character throughout the series. She is Eli's faithful, loyal, and kind wife who is also the rock of the family as the mother to their eight children.

==== Ethan Thompson ====
Ethan Thompson (Tom Aldredge in Seasons 1-2, Ian Hart in Season 5) is a recurring character in Seasons 1-2 and in flashbacks in Season 5. He is Nucky and Eli's abusive father and Elenore's abusive husband. The character is based on Smith E. Johnson.

==== Mrs. McGarry ====
Mrs. McGarry (Dana Ivey) is a recurring character in Season 1. She is a prominent leader of the Women's Suffrage and Temperance Movements. The character is based on Susan B. Anthony.

==== Isabelle Jeunet ====
Isabelle Jeunet (Anna Katarina) is a recurring character in Season 1 and a guest character in Season 3. She is a French woman who owns an haute couture shop on the boardwalk.

==== Louanne Pratt ====
Louanne Pratt (Johnnie Mae) is a recurring character in Season 1. She is Commodore Kaestner's former maid.

==== Eric Sebso ====
Agent Sebso (Erik Weiner) is a recurring character in Season 1. He is a Jewish FBI Agent and Van Alden's junior partner.

==== Mary Dittrich ====
Mary Dittrich (Lisa Joyce) is a recurring character in Season 1. She is a photographer's assistant and Angela Darmody's lover.

==== Pearl ====
Pearl (Emily Meade) is a guest character in Season 1. She is a prostitute and Jimmy Darmody's lover whilst he is in Chicago briefly.

==== Edward L. Bader ====
Edward L. Bader (Kevin O'Rourke) is a recurring character in Seasons 1-4. He is the Atlantic City mayor based on the real-life historical figure of the same name.

==== Jim Neary ====
James Neary (Robert Clohessy) is a recurring character in Seasons 1-2 and a guest character in flashbacks in Season 5 where he is portrayed by Marcus Anturri as a child in 1884 and Scott Moreau as a young man in 1897. He is one of Nucky's political cronies and ward bosses, as well as a childhood friend of Nucky and Eli.

==== Harry Daugherty ====
Harry M. Daugherty (Christopher McDonald) is a guest character in Season 1 and a recurring character in Seasons 2-3. He is a U.S. Attorney General who's based on the real-life historical figure of the same name.

=== Introduced in season two ===
==== Leander Cephas Whitlock ====
Leander Cephas Whitlock (Dominic Chianese) is a recurring character in Seasons 2-4 and in flashbacks in Season 5 where he is portrayed by Jordan Lage. He is an Atlantic City lawyer and ally to the Commodore.

==== George Remus ====
George Remus (Glenn Fleshler) is a recurring character in Seasons 2-3 and a guest character in Season 4. He is a major bootlegger based in Ohio who refers to himself in the third-person and is based on a real-life historical figure of the same name.

In Season 2 George Remus uses his pharmaceutical business in Ohio to sell good quality bootleg alcohol to Al Capone and Johnny Torrio in Chicago. He is competing directly with Nucky Thompson. At first George Remus teams up with Jimmy Darmodys group to control the market in Atlantic City. After Jimmy dies, George Remus changes sides and starts working with Nucky again. He joins a group of crime bosses from New York, Chicago and Philadelphia who are all into bootlegging.

In Season 3, Remus becomes entrenched in the corrupt "Ohio Gang", trading alcohol with political figures like Harry M. Daugherty and Jess Smith. He repeatedly conspires against Nucky and gets caught by Deputy District Attorney Esther Randolph when the government starts cracking down on the Harding administration. He makes a final appearance in Season 4 as an informant. During his prison stay, Remus details Nucky's Atlantic City empire to the FBI, which prompts J. Edgar Hoover to escalate his investigation against Nucky.

==== Dunn Purnsley ====
Dunn Purnsley (Erik LaRay Harvey) is a recurring character in Seasons 2-4.

In Season 2, he is introduced as a career criminal from Baltimore. Dunn initially clashes with Chalky White in jail. However, he eventually earns Chalky's respect after instigating a labour strike among the black culinary workers at the Ritz-Carlton. He soon rises to become Chalky's trusted second-in-command and serves as vital muscle for Chalky and Nucky Thompson, especially during their violent mob war against Gyp Rosetti in Season 3.

In Season 4, Dunn's loyalty falters after he impulsively kills a corrupt booking agent at the Onyx Club. Harlem racketeer Dr. Valentin Narcisse helps hum to hide the crime, using leverage and Dunn's growing resentment of Chalky to lure him away from Nucky's organization. Soon, Dunn becomes Narcisse's top lieutenant and drug runner in Atlantic City. When Chalky finds out about the betrayal, Narcisse orders Dunn to kill him, and during their fight, Dunn is fatally stabbed in the back by Daughter Maitland.

==== Katy ====
Katy (Heather Lind) is a recurring character in Seasons 2-3. She is Margaret's housemaid and Owen's lover.

==== Joe Masseria ====
Joe Masseria (Ivo Nandi) is a recurring character in Seasons 3-4 and a guest character in Seasons 2 and 5. He is an Italian mafia boss and bootlegger.

==== Manny Horvitz ====
Manny Horvitz (William Forsythe) is a recurring character in Season 2 and a guest character in Season 3.

He is a Russian Jewish gangster from Odessa, Russian Empire (modern-day Ukraine), who operates out of Philadelphia using a butcher shop as a front for his criminal activities. After moving to the United States in 1899, Manny partnered with Waxey Gordon in bootlegging and became friends with Polish immigrant Mickey Doyle. His relationship with Gordon, however, deteriorated into a bitter rivalry later.

In Season 2, Manny enters into a bootlegging partnership with Jimmy Darmody. Their relationship quickly turns sour when Jimmy fails to pay his debts and conspires with Waxey Gordon to have Manny assassinated. A vengeful Manny travels to Atlantic City and breaks into Jimmy's home. Intending to kill Jimmy, Manny instead accidentally murders Jimmy's wife, Angela, and her lover. Manny then aligns himself with Nucky Thompson, helping him lure Jimmy to the Atlantic City War Memorial, where Nucky eventually kills him.

In Season 3, Manny shifts to Atlantic City to manage one of Nucky's warehouses alongside Mickey Doyle. Shortly before New Year's Eve in 1922, Manny is ambushed and shot in the face outside his home by Richard Harrow, who murders him to avenge Angela's death.

==== Esther Randolph ====
Esther Randolph (Julianne Nicholson) is a recurring character in Seasons 2-3 and a guest character in Season 4. She is an Assistant Attorney General who investigates Nucky for election fraud. The character is based on Mabel Walker Willebrandt.

=== Introduced in season three ===
==== Billie Kent ====
Billie Kent (Meg Chambers Steedle) is a recurring character in Season 3. She is a young Broadway actress who begins an affair with Nucky. The character is based on Billie Dove.

==== Gaston Means ====
Gaston Means (Stephen Root) is a recurring character in Seasons 3-4. He is a con artist, FBI agent, and "fixer" for bootleggers.

==== Andrew Mellon ====
Andrew Mellon (James Cromwell) is a recurring character in Season 3 and a guest character in Season 4. He is the Secretary of the Treasury.

==== Julia Sagorsky ====
Julia Sagorsky (Wrenn Schmidt) is a recurring character in Seasons 3-4. She is Richard's love interest and later wife and Paul Sagorsky's daughter.

=== Introduced in season four ===
==== Sally Wheet ====
Sally Wheet (Patricia Arquette) is a recurring character in Seasons 4-5. She is a Speak-easy owner in Tampa, Florida who begins a relationship with Nucky.

==== Ralph Capone ====
Ralph Capone (Domenick Lombardozzi) is a recurring character in Seasons 4-5. He is Al and Frank Capone's brother.

==== Frank Capone ====
Frank Capone (Morgan Spector) is a recurring character in the first half of Season 4. He is Al and Ralph Capone's level-headed brother.

==== James Tolliver ====
James "Jim" Tolliver (Brian Geraghty) is a recurring character in Season 4. He is a ruthless FBI agent under the direction of J. Edgar Hoover posing as a corrupt IRS prohibition agent under the name Warren Knox in Atlantic City and is working for Nucky at his warehouses to finally arrest him for all the crimes him and his associates have done.

==== Daughter Maitland ====
Daughter Maitland (Margot Bingham) is a recurring character in Season 4 and a guest character in Season 5. She is a singer and ward of Dr. Valentin Narcisse who begins an affair with Chalky White.

=== Introduced in season five ===
==== Arquimedes ====
Arquimedes (Paul Calderon) is a recurring character in Season 5. He is Nucky Thompson's personal bodyguard from Spain who lives in Havana, Cuba.

==== Tommy Darmody ====
Tommy Darmody/Slim (Brady and Connor Noon in Seasons 1-4, Travis Tope in Season 5) is a guest character in Seasons 1-4 and a recurring character in Season 5. He is the son of James and Angela Darmody and grandson of Gillian Darmody and Commodore Louis Kaestner.

== Characters as performers ==
Actor	Performer	Episode	Notes
Stephen DeRosa	Eddie Cantor	"Boardwalk Empire", "Broadway Limited", "A Return to Normalcy", "A Dangerous Maid", "You'd Be Surprised", "Resolution"	comedian and singer
Erin McGrath	Edith Day	"Anastasia"	"Alice Blue Gown" (from "Irene")
Malachy Cleary	Warren Harding	"Hold Me in Paradise"	Senator
John Treacy Egan	Duncan O'Connor	"Nights in Ballygran"	"Carrickfergus"
A'Lisa Miles	Mamie Smith	"Home"	"Crazy Blues"
Kathy Brier	Sophie Tucker	"Belle Femme"	"Some of These Days"
Remy Auberjonois	Hardeen	"Paris Green"	magician and escape artist (brother of Houdini)

== Characters as athletes ==
Actor	Athlete	Episode	Notes
Devin Harjes	Jack Dempsey	"What Does the Bee Do?" "Peg of Old"	boxer (heavyweight champion, 1919–26)
