= You'd Be Surprised (Boardwalk Empire) =

- Boardwalk Empire episode
- Episode no.: Season 3 Episode 5
- Directed by: Tim Van Patten
- Written by: Diane Frolov; Andrew Schneider; Steve Turner; Joseph E. Iberti; Rick Yorn
- Cinematography by: David Franco
- Editing by: Kate Sanford
- Original air date: October 14, 2012
- Running time: 58 minutes

Guest appearances
- James Cromwell as Andrew Mellon; Stephen Root as Gaston Means; Dominic Chianese as Leander Whitlock; Geoff Pierson as Walter E. Edge; Anatol Yusef as Meyer Lansky; Stephen DeRosa as Eddie Cantor; Meg Steedle as Billie Kent; Erik LaRay Harvey as Dunn Purnsley; Patrick Kennedy as Dr. Douglas Mason; Michael Zegen as Benny Siegel; Arron Shiver as Dean O'Banion; Katy Wright-Mead as Roberta

Episode chronology
← Previous "Blue Bell Boy"	Next → "Ging Gang Goolie"
- Boardwalk Empire (season 3)

"You'd Be Surprised" is the fifth episode of the third season of the American period crime drama television series Boardwalk Empire. It is the 29th overall episode of the series and was written by co-executive producers Diane Frolov and Andrew Schneider, and directed by executive producer Tim Van Patten. It was released on HBO on October 14, 2012.

The series is set in Atlantic City, New Jersey, during the Prohibition era of the 1920s. The series follows Enoch "Nucky" Thompson, a political figure who rises to prominence and interacts with mobsters, politicians, government agents, and the common folk who look up to him. In the episode, Nucky asks Rothstein to help with Gyp Rosetti's interference, while Van Alden faces more problems in Chicago.

According to Nielsen Media Research, the episode was seen by an estimated 2.19 million household viewers and gained a 0.8 ratings share among adults aged 18–49. The episode received critical acclaim, with critics praising the performances, character development and cinematography, although some criticized the episode's pacing.

== Plot ==
Nucky asks Rothstein to help in their problem with Gyp. Rothstein reacts angrily to Nucky's request, blaming Nucky's own carelessness & time with Billie Kent for the situation. As Gyp works for Rothstein's associate Joe Masseria, Rothstein refuses to take retaliation against Gyp. Instead, he feigns an alliance with Gyp, but secretly orders Benny Siegel and Meyer Lansky to kill Gyp.

In Washington, D.C., Treasury Secretary Andrew Mellon testifies before a senate committee with an investigation into political corruption. Gaston Means is aware of the hearing and bribes Walter E. Edge's aide to retrieve any vital information from Mellon's testimony. As the case revolves around corruption claims against Harry M. Daugherty, Means discloses this to Daughterty's associate, Jess Smith.

Gillian meets with Leander Whitlock to ask for a loan for the Artemis Club. He refuses, believing that the revenue does not compensate for the costs. He suggests that she can get the loan by acknowledging Jimmy's death, something that she is still denying. When business is not improving, she is forced to ask the women to go outside to get clients, while writing a letter to Jimmy asking him to come back. Dr. Mason is impressed with Margaret's women's clinic, but attendance proves to be lower than expected. While trying to pass flyers on the boardwalk, Margaret finds Nucky buying a dress for Billie. Hurt, she refuses to let him see the children at home.

In Chicago, Van Alden discovers that Agent Elliott Coughlin, who allowed him to leave the speakeasy, wants to talk with him. Believing that he has been recognized, Van Alden starts fearing that Sigrid may know about his actions. Coughlin shows up at home, and during their talk, Sigrid suddenly hits Coughlin in the head multiple times. However, Coughlin only came to complain about an iron that Van Alden sold him. Van Alden is forced to kill Coughlin to end his suffering and prevent him from going to the authorities. Van Alden then visits Dean O'Banion at his flower shop, asking for his help in disposing of the corpse.

In Tabor Heights, Benny poses as a paper delivery boy attempting to deliver to Gyp's building. After gaining entry, he tries to kill Gyp, who is being given erotic asphyxiation by one of the diner’s waitress. In the process, Benny kills many of Gyp's men in the building, as well as the real paper delivery boy. Gyp is able to retrieve his own gun and shoot back, forcing Benny to flee.

Billie is starring in a new musical, which is running warmup performances in Atlantic City before heading to Broadway. Billie fears that the show will be cancelled. Seeing that the show needs a new male lead to avoid cancellation, Nucky visits with Eddie Cantor and asks him to take the role of the male lead opposite Billie, to no success. Later, Cantor is visited by Chalky White and Dunn Purnsley, intimidating him into agreeing to be in the show. During their rehearsal, Cantor subtly warns Billie that she will eventually be forgotten like Nucky's former mistress Lucy Danziger, confusing her. While viewing the rehearsal, Nucky is informed by Owen that Gyp survived the assassination attempt.

== Production ==
=== Development ===
The episode was written by co-executive producers Diane Frolov and Andrew Schneider, and directed by executive producer Tim Van Patten. This was Frolov's first writing credit, Schneider's first writing credit, and Van Patten's tenth directing credit.

== Reception ==
=== Viewers ===
In its original American broadcast, "You'd Be Surprised" was seen by an estimated 2.19 million household viewers with a 0.8 in the 18-49 demographics. This means that 0.8 percent of all households with televisions watched the episode. This was a slight increase in viewership from the previous episode, which was watched by 2.11 million household viewers with a 0.9 in the 18-49 demographics.

=== Critical reviews ===
"You'd Be Surprised" received critical acclaim. Matt Fowler of IGN gave the episode an "amazing" 9.1 out of 10 and wrote, "Well, if there's one thing this episode, 'You'd Be Surprised', was, it was surprising. Just full of nasty, bloody scenes and painfully awkward moments of silence. It just a vicious ride, through and through. And hat's off to that."

Noel Murray of The A.V. Club gave the episode a "B" grade and wrote, "Not that 'You'd Be Surprised' is a bad episode — it's an essential one in many ways, with multiple standout scenes — but plot-wise, it's easily the most unfocused of this season to date, with appearances by just about every major character, but very little immediately apparent cohesion between any of its many threads."

Alan Sepinwall of HitFix wrote, "Halfway through the year, it feels like the individual pieces of this season have been stronger than the whole, and good enough to forgive some of the sluggish or cartoonish parts. But I'm hopeful things start tying together more as we go into the rest of the season." Seth Colter Walls of Vulture gave the episode a 2 star rating out of 5 and wrote, "Some people in this story universe, having been kept in the dark for various lengths of time, refuse to have 'greater knowledge' hidden from themselves, or from others. As a viewer, it’s not hard to look at this impulse as an entirely understandable and sympathetic one." Chris O'Hara of TV Fanatic gave the episode a perfect 5 star rating out of 5 and wrote, "This week ended with the state of things very far from Hunky Dory. If Nucky thought Gyp a mad dog before, wait till they get a load of him after a botched attempt on his life. He is going to make Cujo look like Odie from Garfield."

Michael Noble of Den of Geek wrote, "I have commented before on the way that Boardwalk Empire slams its characters' personal and business lives together, complicating both sides. This is particularly the case in 'You'd Be Surprised', an excellent episode which shows how badly this can turn out." Michelle Rafferty of Paste gave the episode an 8 out of 10 and wrote, "Boardwalk may not seem all that romantic of a show, but in a way it is, consistently unpacking why we rescue each other. I thought about this a lot last episode, in Nucky's case, but also Sigrid, who just took her role as the supportive, confidence-inspiring wife to a whole new level. When she thinks a prohibition officer, or one of the 'bad men,' is after her husband, she whacks him in the head, proving more than a prop in the case of George Mueller. Her misguided rescue seemed to be an action inspired by true affection and loyalty, and I'm suddenly a lot more interested in watching their relationship unfold as things heat up in Chicago."
