= A Return to Normalcy =

- Boardwalk Empire episode
- Nucky confronts Jimmy
- Episode no.: Season 1 Episode 12
- Directed by: Tim Van Patten
- Written by: Terence Winter
- Original air date: December 5, 2010
- Running time: 62 minutes

Guest appearances
- Gretchen Mol as Gillian Darmody; Robert Clohessy as Alderman Jim Neary; Tracy Middendorf as Babette; William Hill as Alderman George O'Neill; Jack Huston as Richard Harrow; Samuel Taylor as Paddy Ryan; Kevin O'Rourke as Mayor Edward L. Bader; Adam Mucci as Sheriff Raymond Halloran

Episode chronology
← Previous "Paris Green"	Next → "21"

"A Return to Normalcy" is the 12th episode of the first season of HBO television series Boardwalk Empire and the season finale, which premiered on HBO December 5, 2010. The episode was written by series creator Terence Winter and directed by Tim Van Patten, both executive producers.

Nucky and Atlantic City brace for change on Election Day; Torrio brokers a deal between two rivals, with far-reaching consequences; Jimmy ponders his future, as does Margaret, Agent Van Alden, and Eli.

The title of the episode is a reference to the acceptance speech of President Warren G. Harding, which is featured on the show.

== Plot ==
Van Alden requests a transfer out of Atlantic City, although his supervisor at the Bureau of Prohibition asks him to reconsider. Meanwhile, the Commodore's maid admits she tried to poison him with arsenic because of his constant mistreatment. Over the Commodore's protests, Nucky pays her salary and lets her quietly leave the city. Nucky is increasingly stressed about the upcoming election, which the Democrats stand a good chance of winning. Chalky offers to deliver the black vote for $10,000, a new car, and an invitation to the (whites only) victory party on election night.

Margaret and her children are staying with Nan Britton, who insists that Senator Harding will send for her when he is elected president. Margaret does not have the heart to tell her otherwise but is preoccupied with taking care of the children and deciding whether to leave Atlantic City.

Rothstein is about to leave for Scotland to escape an indictment in the Black Sox Scandal when Luciano and Lansky suggest setting up a meeting with Nucky to end the war. At a meeting brokered by Torrio, Nucky agrees to cease hostilities and use his political connections to quash Rothstein's indictment for $1 million in cash and the location of the D'Alessio brothers. As Nucky calls a press conference blaming the D'Alessios for the robbery of Rothstein's shipment, Jimmy, Richard, and Capone murder the gang.

Margaret discovers Nucky had a son who died shortly after childbirth. After talking with him, she becomes convinced he is kind at heart. Jimmy describes his experiences in World War I to Angela, and the two agree to go back to the happier times before the war. However, when she receives a postcard from Paris, she cuts her long hair that Jimmy was so fond of, disappointing him. Van Alden, who vowed to leave Atlantic City unless he received a sign from God, learns from Lucy that she is pregnant.

On election night, Bader is elected mayor. His first decision is to reinstate Eli as sheriff, per Nucky's wishes and to Halloran's visible disappointment, but this fails to mollify Eli. Spoiling the celebration, a drunken Jimmy confronts Nucky, accusing him of pimping out his mother to the Commodore. Margaret and Nucky reunite before Harding is confirmed the winner of the presidential election. Meanwhile, Jimmy is brought to the Commodore's mansion, where the Commodore reveals to Jimmy that he is conspiring with Eli to remove Nucky from power.

The end montage shows the characters contemplating their decisions and futures. Margaret and Nucky leave the party and stand out on the Boardwalk, gazing out towards the ocean as the sun rises.

== First appearance ==
- Langston: Commodore Kaestner's African-American butler taking over as main servant after Louanne leaves.

== Deaths ==
- Leo D'Alessio: the oldest D'Alessio brother, leader of the D'Alessio criminal operation and an acquaintance of Arnold Rothstein, Lucky Luciano and Mickey Doyle. He is murdered by getting his throat slit by Jimmy Darmody on the orders of Nucky and Rothstein whilst he is at a barber shop.
- Ignacious D'Alessio: Leo's younger brother, Matteo, Pius, Sixtus and Lucien's older brother, a member of the D'Alessio criminal operation and an associate of Arnold Rothstein and Mickey Doyle. He is shot to death through the forehead by Richard Harrow on the orders of Nucky and Rothstein.
- Sixtus D'Alessio: Leo, Ignacious, Lucien and Matteo's younger brother, Pius's older brother, a member of the D'Alessio criminal operation and an associate of Arnold Rothstein, Lucky Luciano and Mickey Doyle. He is shot to death through the forehead by Al Capone on the orders of Nucky and Rothstein.
- Pius D'Alessio: the youngest D'Alessio brother, a member of the D'Alessio criminal operation and an associate of Arnold Rothstein, Lucky Luciano and Mickey Doyle. He is shot to death offscreen by Richard on the orders of Nucky and Rothstein after Ignacious's death.
- Unnamed Bootlegger: Shot to death through the back of his head by Luciano and Lansky on a hit ordered by Rothstein.

== Final appearance ==
- Louanne Pratt: Commodore Kaestner's former maid who leaves Atlantic City for her safety after the Commodore blames her for poisoning him.
- Carl Heely: An Irish-American little person and amateur boxer in Atlantic City who also occasionally dresses up as a Leprechaun for St. Patrick's Day.

== Reception ==
=== Critical response ===
IGN gave the episode a score of 8.5. The website said, "As Harding's victory speech calls for a return to normalcy, despite Margaret back in his life, Nucky is poised to return to anything but. 'Every one of us must decide how much sin we can live with.' The amount Nucky has chosen for himself threatens to bite him in the ass, despite the episode's 'happy' ending. For Boardwalk to raise the bar it's already placed quite high, this consequence thing will have to get more play in a second season. For the only thing that can be better than Nucky getting away 'fast, [and] totally devoid of any emotion' is watching him squirm when there are no clean getaways."

=== Ratings ===
The season finale rose two tenths of a point a 1.3 adults 18–49 rating, and added about 300,000 viewers vs. last week. "A Return to Normalcy" had a viewership of 3.294 million.
