= Belle Femme =

- Boardwalk Empire episode
- Jimmy is ambushed by Van Alden
- Episode no.: Season 1 Episode 9
- Directed by: Brad Anderson
- Written by: Steve Kornacki
- Original air date: November 14, 2010
- Running time: 52 minutes

Guest appearances
- Gretchen Mol as Gillian Darmody; Edoardo Ballerini as Ignacious D'Alessio; Danny Burstein as Lolly Steinmann; Max Casella as Lucien D'Alessio; Josiah Early as Robert Dittrich; Lisa Joyce as Mary Dittrich; Peter McRobbie as Supervisor Elliot; Erik Weiner as Agent Sebso; Anatol Yusef as Meyer Lansky

Episode chronology
← Previous "Hold Me in Paradise"	Next → "The Emerald City"

"Belle Femme" is the ninth episode of the first season of the HBO television series Boardwalk Empire, which originally aired on November 14, 2010. It was written by staff writer Steve Kornacki and directed by Brad Anderson.

Nucky intensifies his efforts to deal with the threat posed by the D'Alessio brothers, while Van Alden attempts to arrest Jimmy for the shootings in the woods.

== Plot ==
A recuperating Eli identifies the D'Alessio brothers as the culprits in the casino robbery. Margaret meets Nan Britton, who explains how she and Senator Harding met and how, for him to win the presidential election, he cannot acknowledge their relationship or provide financial support for their daughter. The two women go to Madame Jeunet's to buy a dress for Nan. Jeunet asks Margaret to talk Nucky into reducing the amount of protection money she has to pay him. At first, Margaret broaches the issue directly but this angers Nucky. Taking a different tack, she then tells Nucky she is worried about not looking good for him if Jeunet leaves. Margaret then collects a favor from Jeunet for helping her: a fine new dress at no charge.

Nucky sits down with Jimmy, who insists that their partnership be kept secret and that Nucky bring Richard over from Chicago. Nucky shows Jimmy mugshots of the D'Alessio brothers, implying that he wants them dead; Jimmy finds it almost humorous that Nucky won't issue direct orders, as if he believes that he isn't a gangster. In New York, Rothstein plots a takeover of Atlantic City's criminal underworld after deciding that the city's ports are ideal for establishing smuggling routes across the Eastern seaboard. He meets the D'Alessios and agrees to work with them if they carry out a hit on Nucky. To hedge his "bet" on the hit, Rothstein has his new business partners unwittingly sign life insurance policies with him as the beneficiary.

Angela drinks at home with Robert and Mary Dittrich; Robert tries to initiate a threesome with Angela and Mary but they have to leave when Jimmy arrives unexpectedly. Angela is upset, believing that Jimmy never tried to contact her while he was in Chicago. A pent-up Jimmy forcefully kisses Angela and the two have sex on the kitchen table. The next morning, Jimmy announces that with his new job, they can and should have a second child and move into a better home. Angela later visits the Dittrich studio, where Robert coolly informs her that his art dealer friend is no longer interested in her work, which he derides as "a cheap imitation of Mary Cassatt".

Van Alden is furious at his partner, Eric Sebso, for misplacing a telegram from Jimmy announcing his return to Atlantic City, ruining another chance to arrest him. Van Alden plans to exploit Jimmy's role in the truck heist to coerce him into informing on Nucky. Jimmy and Gillian set up Luciano but before Jimmy can kill him, Van Alden and Sebso burst in and take him into custody. Jimmy denies involvement in the heist but realizes that Van Alden has a witness. Nucky comes to Jimmy's cell and learns of Rothstein's alliance with the D'Alessios, that Luciano confessed to earlier in fear. He assures Jimmy that he already has a plan to get him released. Van Alden orders that the witness be moved upstate and out of Nucky's reach. While relieving himself, the corrupt Sebso shoots the witness dead, injures himself, and plants the body in the back seat of his car to fake an escape attempt, before driving back to Atlantic City.

Nucky meets with Mayor Harry Bacharach and Deputy Halloran, Eli's deputy, who persuades Nucky to appoint him as Eli's replacement until he recovers. The ambitious Halloran asks Nucky to back him as Eli's successor in the coming election, pointing out that Bacharach's opponent has made corruption in the police department a key campaign issue. The Commodore recommends that Eli and the mayor be dropped from the ballot, advising Nucky to look for fresh, untainted candidates that he can control. Nucky and Margaret invite a local businessman, Edward L. Bader, and his wife to dine with them. Nucky informs Bader that Bacharach will not be running for re-election and offers him lucrative construction contracts if he agrees to run in his place. While walking home, Nucky and Margaret are ambushed by the D'Alessios. Nucky's butler Eddie manages to overpower the gunman, resulting in a woman next to Margaret being shot in the shoulder and leaving her dress covered in blood as Nucky holds her in stunned disbelief.

== First appearances ==
- Lucien D'Alessio: Ignacious, Leo and Matteo's younger brother, Pius and Sixtus's older brother, a member of the D'Alessio criminal operation and an acquaintance of Arnold Rothstein, Lucky Luciano and Mickey Doyle.
- Sixtus D'Alessio: Ignacious, Leo, Matteo and Lucien's younger brother, Pius's older brother, a member of the D'Alessio criminal operation and an acquaintance of Arnold Rothstein, Lucky Luciano and Mickey Doyle.
- Edward L. Bader: An Atlantic City businessman who later becomes the mayor and who's also an associate of Nucky Thompson.

== Reception ==
=== Critical reception ===
IGN gave the episode a score of 9 calling it "Outstanding" saying "I've never chatted about any television series around a watercooler. But if I lived anywhere near a time when that really happened, pretty sure Boardwalk Empire's "Belle Femme" would be the topic of discussion. And if you're one of the few out there not watching, then you're missing out on some great conversation."

The A.V. Club rated the episode with a B+.

=== Ratings ===
"Belle Femme" slipped back to a 1.2 adults 18–49 rating and had a total of 2.984 million viewers.
