= Nights in Ballygran =

- Boardwalk Empire episode
- Jimmy tells Pearl a story from his childhood
- Episode no.: Season 1 Episode 5
- Directed by: Alan Taylor
- Written by: Lawrence Konner
- Original air date: October 17, 2010
- Running time: 53 minutes

Guest appearances
- Gretchen Mol as Gillian Darmod; Greg Antonacci as Johnny Torrio; Tom Aldredge as Ethan Thompson; Dana Ivey as Mrs. McGarry; Erik Weiner as Agent Sebso; Emily Meade as Pearl

Episode chronology
← Previous "Anastasia"	Next → "Family Limitation"

"Nights in Ballygran" is the fifth episode of the first season of the HBO television series Boardwalk Empire, which premiered October 17, 2010. It was written by co-executive producer Lawrence Konner and directed by Alan Taylor. "Nights in Ballygran" received positive reviews from critics.

The episode is set during Saint Patrick's Day and progresses the relationship between Nucky and Margaret, while also showing how Jimmy is haunted by the consequences of the life he now leads.

The title is taken from the title line of an Irish folk song, “Carrickfergus”.

== Plot ==
Margaret wakes to see men working for Atlantic City ward boss James Neary offloading barrels of illegal beer into a motor garage behind her house. She meets Nucky on her way to work with a present of soda bread, but he disappoints her with his sudden aloofness and his refusal to accept the gift. Quietly, Nucky tells his brother Eli that he is unwilling to involve Margaret in the violent world he lives in. However, Margaret is deeply hurt and tears up the dress she stole earlier.

After discussing the garage at a Temperance League meeting, Margaret and a colleague meet with Nucky; he feigns interest but then does nothing. Margaret sees the deliveries again that night; brushed off by Neary and ignored altogether by Nucky, she reports Neary to Van Alden and his colleagues. The agents initially dismiss the operation as one of hundreds in the city that they lack the resources to shut down, but Margaret is able to get Van Alden's attention by mentioning that Neary works for Nucky.

As Nucky and Eli prepare for St. Patrick's Day celebrations, Eli mentions his re-election campaign and presses to "say a few words" at the upcoming Saint Patrick's Eve Dinner, an annual gathering of local Irish-American leaders. Nucky is skeptical of Eli's efforts to improve at public speaking, but reluctantly accedes. Local dwarves, who normally run exhibition matches at the local boxing ring, are hired to dress up as leprechauns for the dinner. When they complain about the degrading gig, their leader Carl promises to have Nucky double their pay.

In Chicago, Jimmy takes care of Pearl after her disfigurement, but she continues to spiral into depression and laudanum addiction. Torrio orders Jimmy to throw her out because her scarred face prevents her from working as a prostitute. Jimmy offers to pay for her keep, but soon realizes he can't afford to. Pearl seems to understand her predicament: later that night, she drunkenly flaunts her scarred face in the lounge and, after a last kiss with Jimmy, fatally shoots herself with his gun. Subsequently, Jimmy visits an opium den in Chicago's Chinatown.

Nucky meets with his ward bosses, who anticipate large profits from selling alcohol on St. Patrick's Day. He jokes about Eli's upcoming speech at the dinner, to the amusement of everyone except Eli. Carl comes to see Nucky, who bribes him into selling the other dwarves on a much smaller raise. Elsewhere, in New York, Rothstein reads a newspaper article about the unfolding Black Sox Scandal and refutes his lawyer's suggestion that he let it blow over. Gillian tries to convince Angela that she should start over with another man, even offering to raise Jimmy's son for her. Angela angrily rejects her offer and leaves to meet a "friend", who is later revealed to be the owner of a photography studio on the Boardwalk she grew close to during Jimmy's war service.

At the dinner, Eli's speech turns into a disaster when he brings up the Easter Rising, nearly triggering a violent brawl among the attendees and forcing Nucky to intercede. Eli drinks heavily and reveals just how much he resents his brother's natural charm and popularity. Van Alden, acting on Margaret's information, raids the dinner, arrests Neary, has him paraded before a gaggle of reporters, and has the doors to the clubhouse locked and chained before overseeing the smashing of beer barrels. Nucky sees Margaret among the Temperance League members cheering on the raid and realizes she betrayed him. He angrily confronts her that night at home, and they sleep together after giving into their feelings for each other.

== First appearances ==
- Bill Fallon: Arnold Rothstein's lawyer who tries to help him with the 1919 World Series case which Arnold was a part of.
- Kitty: A prostitute working at the Four Deuces who is friendly with Pearl.
- June Thompson: Eli's wife and mother of his many children including William.
- Ernie Moran: An Atlantic City Irish businessman who's also a member of the Order of Ancient Celts.
- Ethan Thompson: Nucky and Eli's alcoholic and abusive father, the deceased Elenore's abusive husband and a member of the Order of Ancient Celts who was also formerly the Sheriff of Atlantic City.

== Deaths ==
- Pearl: A prostitute working at the Four Deuces and Jimmy's lover in Chicago. She kills herself by using Jimmy's gun to commit suicide in this episode because of her hideous appearance which she got when Liam disfigured her face last episode.

== Final appearance ==
- Mayor Harry Bacharach: The former mayor of Atlantic City who is part of Nucky's organization and is a member of the Order of Ancient Celts.

== Reception ==
=== Critical reception ===
IGN said the episode was "Outstanding" and gave the episode 9/10. They said "For those who are still on the fence about Boardwalk Empire's greatness, shut up and watch episode five, "Nights in Ballygran". The episode features the show's strongest character interactions yet, as Margaret's role in the Temperance League threatens both Nucky's political and criminal enterprises as Federal Agent Van Alden applies pressure to both." "The more shows like this make it harder for their main characters to do the right thing - the farther away they get from what the right thing is - is when television approaches being great. With "Nights in Ballygran", Boardwalk pushes past great and puts its sights on landmark."

=== Ratings ===
The episode rebounded a bit to a 1.3 adults 18–49 rating after the previous week's plunge to a 1.1 rating and received a total of 2.850 million viewers.
