= Hold Me in Paradise =

- Boardwalk Empire episode
- Angela receives nothing from Jimmy
- Episode no.: Season 1 Episode 8
- Directed by: Brian Kirk
- Written by: Meg Jackson
- Original air date: November 7, 2010
- Running time: 50 minutes

Guest appearances
- Gretchen Mol as Gillian Darmody; Greg Antonacci as Johnny Torrio; Edoardo Ballerini as Ignacious D'Alessio; Danny Burstein as Lolly Steinmann; Max Casella as Lucien D'Alessio; Jack Huston as Richard Harrow; Christopher McDonald as General Harry Daugherty; Geoff Pierson as Senator Walter Edge

Episode chronology
← Previous "Home"	Next → "Belle Femme"

"Hold Me in Paradise" is the eighth episode of the first season of the HBO television series Boardwalk Empire, which premiered on November 7, 2010. It was written by staff writer Meg Jackson and directed by Brian Kirk. Nucky attends the Republican National Convention in Chicago, while Eli fills in for him in Atlantic City.

== Plot ==
Nucky visits Chicago as a delegate for the 1920 Republican National Convention, where he finds himself intrigued by the candidacy of Warren G. Harding over more established candidates, including the presumed front-runner Leonard Wood. Discovering that the married Harding has a daughter out of wedlock with a young woman named Nan Britton, Nucky persuades campaign manager Harry Daugherty that he can deliver the votes of the New Jersey delegation in exchange for Daugherty blocking Senator Edge's nomination for the vice-presidency, as Nucky is eager to exact revenge on Edge for refusing to give him the road funds for Atlantic City. He also agrees to hide Nan and her child until Harding is elected president.

Nucky stops by the Four Deuces; while conversing with Torrio and a federal judge from Ohio, Jimmy comes downstairs to deal with an unruly guest and runs into his old patron. Nucky behaves coldly towards Jimmy as he is upset that the latter has never called or sent money to his family, unaware that Van Alden, working out of Atlantic City's post office, has been intercepting the steady stream of money and letters Jimmy sends to Angela. Back home, while collecting money at an illegal casino, Eli walks into an armed robbery by the D'Alessio brothers and sustains a bullet wound while trying to stop them from escaping.

When Nucky learns that Eli has been incapacitated, he asks Jimmy to come back to Atlantic City as his personal enforcer, reminding him that, as an Irishman among Italians, Jimmy will always be an outsider in Torrio's crew. Nucky stresses that he needs Jimmy's help in the intensifying turf war against Rothstein and the D'Alessios, offering in return a percentage share in his bootlegging operations and help in dealing with Van Alden's investigation of Jimmy's truck heist. Jimmy is initially hesitant, but ultimately reconsiders after watching Capone and the others speak Italian while playing cards, all while feeling completely left out.

Van Alden's wife, desiring a child even though she is infertile, asks him to pay so she can undergo an expensive operation. He gathers all the money he has intercepted from Jimmy, then mails an envelope to his wife. However, it is soon revealed that he had actually sent the money to Angela; his wife receives a letter in which he informs her that he doesn't want children and won't pay for the surgery. Rothstein prepares for legal trouble over his role in the Black Sox Scandal. Margaret has a public spat with Lucy and finds herself entangled in Nucky's affairs when he calls from Chicago and asks her to hide a ledger that contains every detail of his criminal empire. Margaret spends the entire night sitting at Nucky's desk and, against his instructions, reads the ledger.

== First appearances ==
- Nan Britton: President Warren G. Harding's mistress and Elizabeth's mother who becomes friends with Margaret in Atlantic City.
- Jess Smith: Harry Daugherty's political aide and best friend who's also a member of the "Ohio Gang".
- Harry Daugherty: An Ohio-based politician, Jess Smith's best friend, the leader of the "Ohio Gang", President Harding's campaign manager and a political associate and acquaintance of Nucky Thompson.

== Reception ==
=== Critical reception ===
IGN gave the episode a score of 7.5 describing it as "a calm before the storm episode, [it] also succeeds at settling Nucky's political ties by establishing new ones, this time tethered to Warren Harding's Presidential campaign. The sky may be the limit on Nucky's political capital, but all he wants are his roads to Atlantic City. And he'll need them, as the war threatens to bring both allies and enemies to Nucky's town."

The A.V. Club gave it a B rating.

=== Ratings ===
"Hold Me in Paradise" boosted its adults 18–49 rating 0.3 points to a 1.5 rating. The episode had a total of 3.213 million viewers.
