= The Bomb-itty of Errors =

Hip hop theatre retelling of The Comedy of Errors

The Bomb-itty of Errors is a hip hop theater retelling of Shakespeare's The Comedy of Errors. Written and performed by Jordan Allen-Dutton, Jason Catalano, GQ, and Erik Weiner, the show has been performed in New York City, London (West End), Chicago, Dublin, Edinburgh, Florida, Aspen, Syracuse, Vancouver, Philadelphia, Victoria BC, and Los Angeles.

The 1999–2000 Off-Broadway production at the Bleecker Street Theater was nominated for the 2000 Outstanding New Off-Broadway Play at the Outer Critics Circle Awards. It was nominated for Best Lyrics at the Drama Desk Awards, and received the Jefferson Award in Chicago and the Grand Jury Prize at the HBO US Comedy Arts Festival in Aspen.

The show lasts one hour and thirty minutes and is part play and part rap concert. The four actors play all the characters (male and female), while a DJ spins the beats onstage. The music was written by JAQ and the show was directed and developed by Andy Goldberg.
