= Home (Boardwalk Empire) =

- Boardwalk Empire episode
- Episode no.: Season 1 Episode 7
- Directed by: Allen Coulter
- Written by: Tim Van Patten; Paul Simms
- Original air date: October 31, 2010
- Running time: 53 minutes

Guest appearances
- Tom Aldredge as Ethan Thompson; Michael Badalucco as Harry Prince; Edoardo Ballerini as Ignacious D'Alessio; Max Casella as Lucien D'Alessio; Jack Huston as Richard Harrow; Lisa Joyce as Mary Dittrich; Erik Weiner as Agent Sebso; Anatol Yusef as Meyer Lansky

Episode chronology
← Previous "Family Limitation"	Next → "Hold Me in Paradise"

"Home" is the seventh episode of the first season of HBO's crime drama Boardwalk Empire. The episode aired on October 31, 2010. The episode was written by executive producer Tim Van Patten and Paul Simms and directed by Allen Coulter.

The episode focuses on Nucky as he deals with unpleasant memories of his abusive father. Jimmy brings a fellow veteran into his crime family, while Luciano and a friend cut a deal with the D'Alessio brothers as they move to expand into Atlantic City.

== Plot ==
In Chicago, Jimmy learns from Capone that Liam, the Irish mobster who disfigured Pearl, regularly eats breakfast at the same restaurant. Later that day, he consults a doctor about recurring pain in his leg caused by his war wounds and agrees to take a psychological test designed to study the trauma of veterans. While waiting for the test, he meets Richard Harrow, a severely wounded sharpshooter who wears a tin mask over his disfigured face. After picking up that Richard is uncomfortable and nervous, Jimmy lies to the nurses and gets them both out of the test. He then takes Richard over to the Four Deuces, providing him with free drinks and the services of a prostitute.

Back in Atlantic City, Jimmy's estranged fiancé, Angela, is revealed to be in an affair with photographer Robert Dittrich's wife, Mary, who has arranged for an art dealer to assess her paintings. A man calling himself "Michael Lewis" offers Chalky a deal to sell alcohol directly to him without paying Nucky first; Chalky believes Nucky is testing his loyalty and declines. Luciano and "Lewis"–his associate Meyer Lansky–meet with the D'Alessio brothers to discuss their burgeoning bootlegging operation. Luciano suggests financing the venture by robbing one of Nucky's casinos and assures the brothers that he can persuade Rothstein to back them against Nucky.

Nucky and Eli's elderly father has an accident at the old Thompson family home, and Eli takes him in. Nucky agrees to give the decrepit property to an associate, Damien Flemming, who is eager to start a family. A jealous Lucy confronts Nucky over his relationship with Margaret. When Margaret convinces him that he shouldn't feel afraid to confide in her, Nucky reveals how his father loathed and abused him, and how he's carried the memories of that abuse ever since. Van Alden learns of Jimmy's involvement from a petty criminal who assisted him and Capone during their truck heist and convinces the man to testify in court as an informant.

Jimmy confronts Liam and makes it clear he never wants to see his face again. Shortly after he leaves, a sniper's bullet, fired by Richard from the apartment across the street from the restaurant, strikes Liam beneath his eye and kills him. Lucy watches the film Dr. Jekyll and Mr. Hyde alone after Nucky breaks his promise to attend the showing with her. Nucky and his father have an unpleasant encounter as they look over the now-remodeled home. Nucky calmly lights a match and sets fire to the house; when the startled Damien arrives, he gives him all the cash in his pocket so he can "find a better place to live."

== First appearances ==
- Odette: A prostitute working at the Four Deuces who is acquainted with Al, Jimmy and later on Richard.
- Carl Surran: An Atlantic City doctor who helps the Thompson family and Commodore Kaestner whenever they are sick or hurt.
- Meyer Lansky: A Jewish-American New York gangster, protege of Arnold Rothstein and associate and best friend of Lucky Luciano.
- Richard Harrow: A WW1 veteran and former US Army sniper living in Chicago who becomes Jimmy's best friend.

== Deaths ==
- Liam: Charlie Sheridan's enforcer and a contract killer who is shot just below his right eye from afar by Richard Harrow on orders of Jimmy Darmody for attacking the Four Deuces and disfiguring Pearl which led to her eventual death. This shot would be similar to the one described by Harrow to Jimmy while waiting for their appointment (killing a German sniper by shooting him just below the eye).

== Reception ==
=== Critical reception ===
IGN gave the episode 8 out of 10. Calling the episode "Impressive." They said "The scene in the diner where Pearl's attacker is taken out is near-perfect, blemished only by a directorial choice that draws too much attention to itself. Michael Pitt's delivery of the story about Jimmy shooting a German soldier, while the German tried to make it over barbed-wire fencing, applies the right amount of tension to the scene—moments before the man on the receiving end of the conversation gets a sniper's bullet to the face. A shot Panic Room-ing through the window's bullet hole to reveal Harrow as the shooter clashes with the show's 'less is more' shooting style, (It's the most stylistic flourish since the pilot)."

=== Ratings ===
The episode dropped a bit in total viewers but was steady with adults 18–49. 2.670 million viewers watched the episode.
