= Return to normalcy =

1920 U.S. political campaign slogan

Return to Normalcy Address
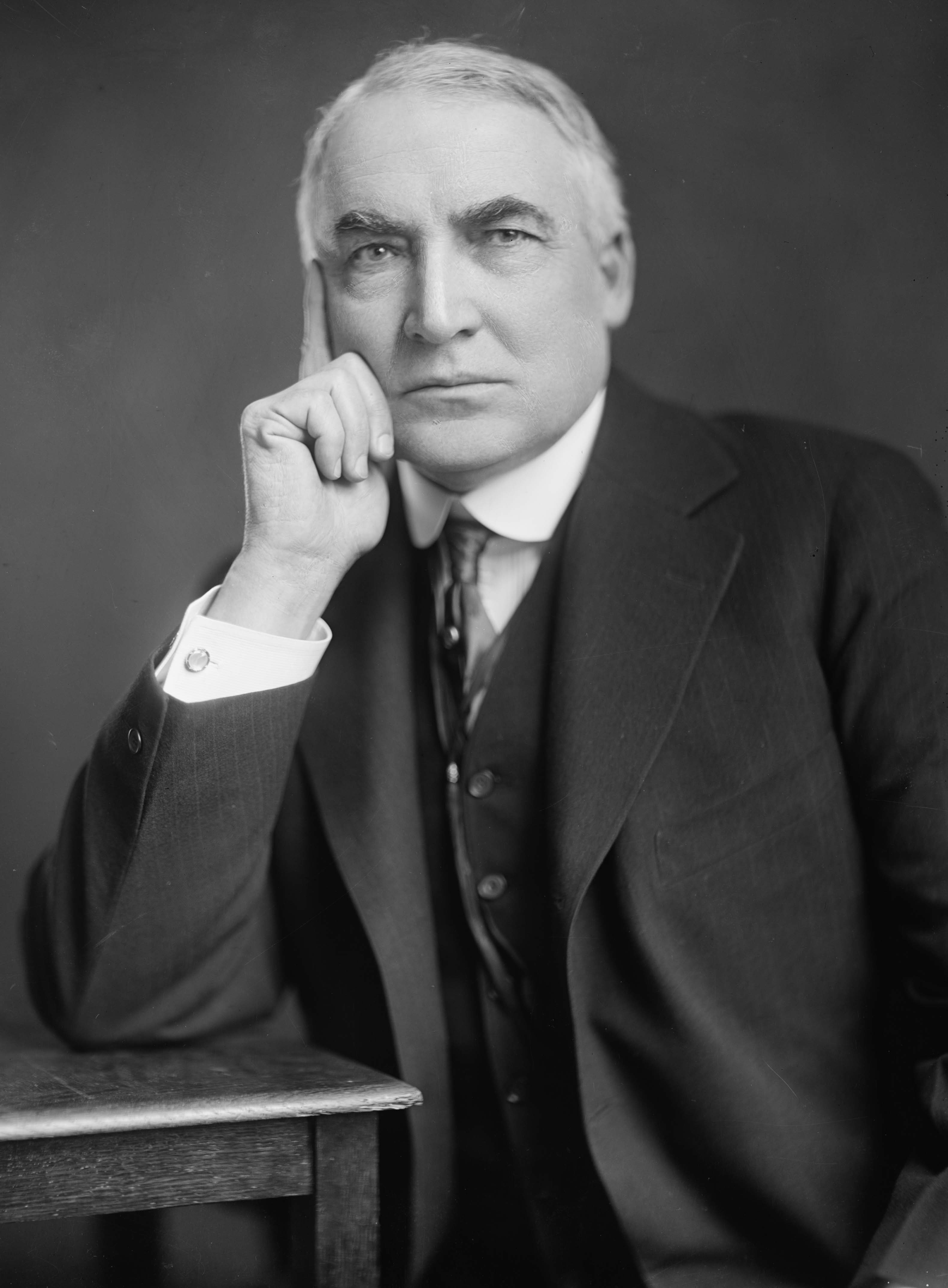
- Warren G. Harding delivering the address that defined his political message.
- Date: May 14, 1920
- Location: Home Market Club, Boston, Massachusetts
- Type: Political speech, campaign launch
- Target: 1920 United States presidential election
- Organized by: Republican National Committee
- Famous excerpt: "America's present need is not heroics, but healing; not nostrums, but normalcy.”

"Return to normalcy" was a campaign slogan used by Warren G. Harding during the 1920 United States presidential election. Harding won the election with 60.4% of the popular vote.

== 1920 election ==
In a speech delivered on May 14, 1920, Harding proclaimed that America needed "not nostrums, but normalcy". Two months later, during a homecoming speech, Harding reaffirmed his endorsement of "normal times and a return to normalcy."

World War I and the Spanish flu had upended life, and Harding said that it altered the perspective of humanity. He argued that the solution was to seek normalcy by restoring life to how it was before the war. Harding's conception of normalcy for the 1920s included deregulation, civic engagement, and isolationism. He rejected the idealism of Woodrow Wilson and the activism of Theodore Roosevelt, favoring the earlier isolationist policy of the United States.

Detractors of the time tried to belittle the word "normalcy" as a neologism as well as a malapropism, saying that it was poorly coined by Harding, as opposed to the more accepted term normality. There was contemporaneous discussion and evidence that normalcy had been listed in dictionaries as far back as 1857. According to some historians, normalcy was an "obscure math term" before its use by Harding during the campaign. Harding, a newspaper editor, addressed the issue of the word's origin, claiming that normalcy but not normality appeared in his dictionary.

Harding prominently featured his dog Laddie Boy in the press to instill the domestic image associated with his vision of normalcy.

Harding's position attracted support during the 1920 presidential election, winning 60.3% of the popular vote.

=== Americanism ===
Harding's foreign policy was derived from his Americanism speech delivered in 1920. In it he preached vigilant isolationism in order for American to recover from the first WW1, refocus on internal improvements, and America first.

== Other usage ==
Chalmers M. Roberts of The Washington Post compared the desire for a "return to normalcy" in 1920 to the 1946 midterms following World War II and the 1992 presidential election following the Cold War.

The 12th episode of Boardwalk Empire takes place during the 1920 election and is titled "A Return to Normalcy".

The phrase "return to normalcy" became associated with the 2020 presidential campaign of Joe Biden, specifically referring to Biden's promises to end the "divisiveness of the Trump years," as well as his campaign's focus on tackling the COVID-19 pandemic in the United States.

== See also ==
- New normal, also concerned with trying to emerge from abnormal periods
- Presidency of Warren G. Harding
- Make America Great Again
