= Anastasia (Boardwalk Empire) =

- Boardwalk Empire episode
- Nucky prepares for his birthday party
- Episode no.: Season 1 Episode 4
- Directed by: Jeremy Podeswa
- Written by: Lawrence Konner; Margaret Nagle
- Original air date: October 10, 2010
- Running time: 53 minutes

Guest appearances
- Gretchen Mol as Gillian Darmody; Greg Antonacci as Johnny Torrio; Edoardo Ballerini as Ignacious D'Alessio; Max Casella as Lucien D'Alessio; Chris Mulkey as Governor Frank Hague; Geoff Pierson as Senator Walter Edge; Emily Meade as Pearl; Frank Shattuck as Charlie Sheridan

Episode chronology
← Previous "Broadway Limited"	Next → "Nights in Ballygran"

"Anastasia" is the fourth episode of the first season of the HBO television series Boardwalk Empire, which premiered October 10, 2010. It was written by co-executive producer Lawrence Konner and supervising producer Margaret Nagle and directed by Jeremy Podeswa. The episode received generally favorable reviews from television critics.

The episode centers on Nucky celebrating his birthday while dealing with several simultaneous crises and Jimmy getting settled into his new home of Chicago as he begins to learn the ropes of being a gangster.

The title of the episode comes from a contemporary news story in March 1922 when Anna Anderson, a Polish factory worker, surfaced claiming to be the lost Grand Duchess Anastasia of Russia, only for her claims to be proven fraudulent.

== Plot ==
In Chicago, Jimmy finds himself working for Torrio, who puts him up in the Four Deuces, a brothel operated by Capone. Jimmy dislikes having to rely on the notoriously short-tempered Capone but puts up with it as he needs work. Torrio, displeased with Capone's rough treatment of bar owners who refuse to buy his alcohol, requests that he and Jimmy negotiate with Chicago's Irish mob for a larger share of their territory so as to prevent further bloodshed. Ignoring Jimmy's advice to accept a smaller deal and bide his time, Capone physically threatens the Irish boss, Charlie Sheridan, into accepting a blatantly unfair deal.

Back in Atlantic City, as Nucky plans his "surprise" birthday party, he worries that Chalky might refuse to deliver the black voters his machine depends on if the lynching of his driver is not resolved. Eli delivers the leader of the local chapter of the Ku Klux Klan to Chalky, who tortures him until he is satisfied that the Klan was not involved in the killing. As it turns out, the murder was actually committed by Mickey Doyle and the D'Alessio brothers, who mistook the driver for Chalky himself. Mickey, still under pressure to repay the D'Alessio family, convinces them that they can make an easy $3,000 by robbing one of Nucky's ward bosses during collections.

At Nucky's party, he is displeased to find that many of the attendees are still in denial about the power of the women's vote, a feeling only reinforced when he runs into Margaret and is impressed by both her intellect and her willingness to challenge male politicians who dismiss women as too "weak" to understand politics. When Nucky's beautiful but airheaded mistress Lucy shows up in a risqué costume, he can't help but watch Margaret as she quietly leaves. Margaret herself becomes increasingly attracted to Nucky after they share a dance, and steals an expensive dress from her employer after noticing how well-dressed Lucy is when she's on Nucky's arm.

At a private conference, Senator Walter Edge informs Nucky that he will not receive the roadbuilding funds he needs to complete Atlantic City's development, which will go instead to his political rival, Mayor Frank Hague of Jersey City. Nucky tries to offer Hague a payoff instead, but Edge refuses to change his decision, telling Nucky "you can't have everything you want". The next day, Nucky sends him an expensive case of Pimm's Cup with a card marked, "I do expect to have everything.".

Luciano finds Jimmy's mother Gillian at his house and tells her he is looking for "James", claiming to be a close friend. She sees through his cover story and throws him out. Luciano follows her around for several days; she spots him and initiates a physical relationship when Luciano admits his lust for her. Sheridan's men visit the Four Deuces and vandalize the bar; Jimmy's girlfriend Pearl is left permanently disfigured when one of the men cuts up her face with a knife. Capone quietly comforts a distraught Jimmy.

== First appearances ==
- Pearl: A prostitute working at the Four Deuces in Chicago and Jimmy's lover over there.
- Charlie Sheridan: A Chicago mob boss, the owner of Greektown and Torrio and Capone's rival.
- Liam: A contract killer and enforcer working for Charlie Sheridan.
- Matteo D'Alessio: Ignacious and Leo's younger brother, Pius's older brother, a member of the D'Alessio criminal operation and an acquaintance of Arnold Rothstein and Mickey Doyle.
- Frank Hague: The mayor of Jersey City and a New Jersey politician who clashes with Nucky Thompson.
- Walter Edge: A US Senator for New Jersey and an Atlantic County politician connected to Nucky.

== Reception ==
=== Critical reception ===
The episode received positive reviews from critics. IGN gave the episode their highest rating up to that point with an 8.5 and said "It's amazing that the writers found a way to commit so much good storytelling into one hour of television." They also said ""Anastasia", Boardwalk's fourth episode, is so far its best, turning its criminals into sympathetic characters despite their vices and secrets, and doing so without resorting to forced or saccharine ways." TV Fanatic gave the episode 4.5/5.0 and enjoyed the transformation of Margaret. "My favorite moment of the night was Margaret's brilliant transformation into a well-spoken and intelligent character. Her change from a quiet wallflower with small ambitions came at the best time, during Nucky's party. As the Commodore repeated his enraging "test" of female intelligence and political acumen on Lucy ("You're assuming they have minds at all"), Margaret voices an informed opinion about Women's Suffrage by stating, "In most civilized countries, women are afforded that privilege."

=== Ratings ===
The episode plunged to a 1.1 adults 18–49 rating this week from a 1.4 the week before, and lost over 800,000 average viewers from the week before.
