= Richard Harrow =

- Boardwalk Empire character
- First appearance: "Home"
- Last appearance: "Farewell Daddy Blues"
- Created by: Terence Winter
- Portrayed by: Jack Huston

In-universe information
- Gender: Male
- Occupation: Sniper, contract killer
- Family: Emma Harrow (sister)
- Spouse: Julia Sagorsky
- Nationality: American

Richard Harrow is a fictional character on the television series Boardwalk Empire, played by the actor Jack Huston.

== Fictional biography ==
=== Backstory ===
Richard was a sharpshooter in the United States Army during World War I. He was badly disfigured during the war, losing his eye, upper jaw and most of the cheekbone on the left side of his face. He has also suffered some throat damage, which causes him to speak in a low, guttural croak. Because of his appearance, Harrow wears a tin mask in public that is molded to mirror the intact right side of his face.

After the war he returned to Plover, Wisconsin where his twin sister, Emma (Katherine Waterston), cared for him while his wounds healed. Once he was able to care for himself, he left to live in Chicago.

=== Season 1 ===
Richard meets fellow veteran Jimmy Darmody (Michael Pitt) in an army hospital in Chicago, and they become fast friends. To prove his loyalty, Richard kills a local gangster who had disfigured a young prostitute with whom Jimmy was close. Jimmy invites Richard to stay with him and his family, and brings him on as muscle in his bootlegging outfit.

Richard accompanies Jimmy back to New Jersey, where he becomes a hitman working for Jimmy under Nucky Thompson (Steve Buscemi). After an attempt on Nucky by the D'Alessio brothers, Richard temporarily moves into the Thompson home where he acts as a bodyguard to Nucky, his companion Margaret Schroeder (Kelly Macdonald) and her two small children. At first Margaret and her children are frightened by Richard's appearance, but they eventually warm up to him. After a truce is made between Nucky and Arnold Rothstein to resolve their conflict, Richard, Jimmy, and Al Capone (Stephen Graham) are dispatched to assassinate the remaining D'Alessio brothers.

=== Season 2 ===
Richard is now established as the right-hand man on Jimmy's bootlegging crew. Jimmy and Richard have now gone into business with Charlie "Lucky" Luciano (Vincent Piazza), Meyer Lansky (Anatol Yusef), and Capone. Richard befriends Jimmy's wife Angela (Aleksa Palladino). Angela, a painter, asks Richard if she can do his portrait; he reluctantly agrees. During their session, Richard confides in Angela that he and his sister have not spoken since he left home. Richard then voluntarily removes his mask, and she paints his portrait.

Richard ventures out into a secluded forest during a Memorial Day ceremony, intending to commit suicide. As he puts a shotgun in his mouth, a stray dog runs off with his tin mask. Richard chases the dog, and finds two hunters sitting around a campfire, who convince him to keep on living.

Richard serves as Jimmy's lieutenant throughout a turf war with Nucky, and remains loyal even as they suffer serious financial losses. Richard is devastated when Angela is murdered by Manny Horvitz (William Forsythe) as revenge for an attempt by Jimmy to assassinate him over a $5,000 debt Jimmy refused to pay him, and begins to wonder if their business is worth the price they pay.

To mend fences with Nucky, Richard and Jimmy go to Alderman James Neary (Robert Clohessy), scheduled to testify against Nucky, force him to type a note at gunpoint exonerating Nucky, then Richard shoots him in the head and stages his death as a suicide. When Nucky calls Jimmy and says they have captured Horvitz, both Jimmy and Richard sense a trap, and Richard offers to go along. Jimmy refuses and tells Richard to try and put the war behind him. After Jimmy is murdered, Richard moves in with Jimmy's mother Gillian (Gretchen Mol) at her estate.

=== Season 3 ===
One year later, Richard is a permanent resident in Gillian's brothel. Richard now acts as a caretaker at the brothel, and looks after Jimmy's son Tommy. Richard also seeks vengeance on Horvitz, who has now become a partner in Nucky's gang, for Angela's death. On New Year's Eve, Richard waits outside Horvitz's house, and after killing his driver, shoots him in the face with a shotgun as he is leaving to pursue a thief who stole from one of Nucky's warehouses.

Richard ventures off one evening to the American Legion for support and to discuss compensation which has been promised to wounded veterans. It is here that Richard meets Paul Sagorsky (Mark Borkowski), a bitter drunk who lost his son in the war. Richard looks after Paul when he is injured in a bar fight, and meets Paul's daughter Julia (Wrenn Schmidt). He falls in love with her, and they begin a courtship, despite her father's objections.

Later in the season, Gillian's brothel is occupied by New York gangster Gyp Rosetti (Bobby Cannavale), who is at war with Nucky. Fearing for Tommy's safety, Richard attempts to remove the boy to Julia's house, but Gillian finds out about the plan and, angered, she has Rosetti's men kick Richard out. After Joe Masseria withdraws his support for Rosetti's campaign against Nucky, his men withdraw from the brothel, giving an opening for Richard to arm himself and methodically kill almost everyone in Rosetti's own gang (save for Rosetti himself, his right-hand Tonino Sandrelli, and two others), recovering Tommy, whom he leaves at the Sagorsky home. Richard then flees Atlantic City.

=== Season 4 ===
One year later, Richard makes his way to his childhood home in Wisconsin to visit Emma. Richard returns home to find Emma widowed, pregnant and in debt. During his visit with his sister, Richard finds it difficult to put down the family dog. During this time Richard is tracked down by a former client who had hired Richard previously to carry out an assassination contract that was not honored. They corner Richard in the barn; during the ensuing struggle, Richard kills one of the gangsters, but the other one breaks Richard's hand and nearly kills him. Emma arrives just in time and kills the gangster, saving Richard's life. Richard realizes he is a danger to his sister and decides to go back to Atlantic City.

Upon returning to Atlantic City, Richard bumps into Sagorsky, who is dying of cirrhosis of the liver. Richard finds out that Julia is locked in a custody battle with Gillian over Tommy. Richard returns to the Sagorskys' home to help Julia, who he marries. To provide for his new family, Richard gets a job washing dishes at the Onyx Club, with the help of Nucky.

When Gillian is arrested for murder, Richard and Julia see an opportunity to get permanent custody of Tommy. Gillian claims that the body found on her estate was that of her son, Jimmy, and with the body having been cremated, there is no way to prove otherwise. In order to undermine her story, Richard asks Nucky for the location where Jimmy's body is actually buried. Nucky agrees to tell Richard, but for a price: he must eliminate New York gangster Dr. Valentin Narcisse (Jeffrey Wright), who is causing problems for Nucky and his associate Chalky White (Michael K. Williams). As he prepares to shoot Narcisse, he hesitates and his hand shakes, and he accidentally kills White's daughter Maybelle (Christina Jackson) when she unexpectedly steps into the line of fire. Richard is mortally wounded in the ensuing gunfire, but manages to make his way to the Atlantic City Boardwalk, where he crawls to safety underneath it. Harrow has a final vision of returning home, to the loving embrace of his family, before he removes his mask and dies in the sand.

== Interview ==
Jack Huston was interviewed by Rolling Stone magazine. Huston stated that he was only told that his character was going to die during the filming of the episode depicting Harrow's death. Huston stated that it was very appropriate for Harrow, a tragic character, to die tragically. Feeling honored rather than upset about the ending, Huston claimed that the writers wrote "the most unbelievably beautiful ending, and it made so much sense." Glad to have played a longer-than-initially-expected role in Boardwalk Empire, Huston stated that it was the start of his career in acting. Terence Winter said that if Harrow were not fatally wounded after shooting Maybelle, then Harrow would have committed suicide. Huston agrees that Harrow would have done that, as killing Maybelle would be unforgivable in Harrow's mind. Huston stated that at first "Richard was a brilliant killer"; then he gave up killing, losing confidence; later, he was intuitive and expected himself to err; after shooting Maybelle he hesitated, allowing himself to be shot. Huston posited that Harrow's scrapbook became a reality: he fell in love, married, and had a family. Regarding Harrow's vision at the end of his life, Huston stated "In a way he reached heaven in his life."
