= Erik Weiner =

American actor, writer, and producer (born 1977)

- Occupations: Actor; writer; comedian; producer
- Years active: 1999–present
- Children: 2
- Website: http://www.erikweiner.com

Erik Weiner is an American actor, writer, comedian, and producer best known for co-creating the play The Bomb-itty of Errors and his role as Agent Sebso on HBO's Boardwalk Empire.

== Career ==
In 1999, he co-created and starred in The Bomb-itty of Errors, an adaptation of Shakespeare's The Comedy of Errors, blending hip-hop and Shakespeare. The show has been performed in New York City (Off-Broadway), London (West End), Chicago, Los Angeles, Amsterdam, Edinburgh, Dublin, Florida, Philadelphia, St. Louis, and continues to play around the world.

Weiner was invited to be a fellow at the Sundance Institute's Screenwriting Lab in 2002.

In 2002 Weiner co-created and starred in the MTV sketch comedy series Scratch & Burn. He made his feature film debut in the 20th Century Fox romantic comedy Brown Sugar, starring Sanaa Lathan, Taye Diggs, Mos Def and Queen Latifah.

In 2005, Weiner played Dragon on HBO's Unscripted, directed and executive produced by George Clooney.

Weiner's music video "Shawshank In A Minute", directed by John Landis, won JibJab's Great Sketch Experiment in 2006.

His musical comedy NERDS, written with collaborator Jordan Allen-Dutton and music composed by Hal Goldberg, won Barrymore Awards for Outstanding New Play and Outstanding Original Music in 2007.

Weiner received three Emmy Award nominations in 2007, 2008, and 2012 for writing on Robot Chicken.

Weiner has produced such shows as America's Best Dance Crew, Snoop Dogg's Fatherhood, The Sing-Off, and served as the Head Writer on the MTV Movie Awards in 2010, 2011, and 2013. He was Creative Producer of the 2011 Emmy Awards. He was awarded a Peabody Award for his writing on CNN Heroes.

Weiner, along with his brother, Mark Weiner, has written episodes and songs for Netflix's Emmy Award winning animated kid series Ask the StoryBots, with their popular Dinosaur, Space, and Animal songs receiving over a billion streams.

In 2010, Weiner played Agent Sebso on HBO's Boardwalk Empire, executive produced by Terence Winter and Martin Scorsese. Winter saw his 2008 YouTube video, "One Line on the Sopranos" (a tribute to the actual one line he had on The Sopranos, playing a store manager who said, "Leon, take your break at two" in the 2001 season 3 episode "Another Toothpick") Winter had written that Sopranos episode, and, thus, that one line, and this led to Mr. Weiner being cast on the series. In 2011, Mr. Weiner won a Screen Actors Guild Award for Outstanding Performance By An Ensemble In A Drama Series for Boardwalk Empire.

In 2012 and 2013, Weiner played Ian on NBC's The New Normal. In 2016, Weiner began writing and producing on The Goldbergs on ABC.

== Personal life ==
Weiner lives in Los Angeles with his wife and two daughters.

== Filmography ==
=== Acting ===
==== Film ====
Year	Title	Role	Notes
2002	Brown Sugar	Ren	
2005	Serenity	Helmsman	

==== Television ====
Year	Title	Role	Notes
2000	The Street	D.J.	Episode: "Miracle on Wall Street"
2001	The Sopranos	Manager	Episode: "Another Toothpick"
2002	Third Watch	Charlie B.	Episode: "Old Dogs, New Tricks"
2005	Unscripted	Dragon	10 episodes
2008–2018	Robot Chicken	Various voices	6 episodes
2010	Boardwalk Empire	Agent Sebso	9 episodes
2012–2013	The New Normal	Ian	3 episodes
2018, 2019	The Goldbergs	Sheriff / Marc Birek	2 episodes

==== Video games ====
Year	Title	Role	Notes
2004	Grand Theft Auto: San Andreas	Pedestrian	Uncredited

=== Writing ===
Year	Title	Notes
2004	Scratch and Burn	Also co-creator
2006–2018	Robot Chicken	31 episodes
2007	Robot Chicken: Star Wars	Television film
2007–2008	Snoop Dogg's Father Hood	4 episodes; also producer
2008	2008 MTV Movie Awards	Television special
2008	The 2nd Annual CNN Heroes: An All-Star Tribute	Television special
2009	2009 MTV Movie Awards	Television special
2010	2010 MTV Movie Awards	Television special
2010	Spike TV VGA Video Game Awards	Television special
2013	28th Independent Spirit Awards	Television special
2014	29th Independent Spirit Awards	Television special
2014	2014 Kids' Choice Sports	Television special
2015	41st People's Choice Awards	Television special
2015	30th Independent Spirit Awards	Television special
2015	SuperMansion	12 episodes
2016	42nd People's Choice Awards	Television special
2016–present	The Goldbergs	47 episodes; also producer
2016–2018	Ask the StoryBots	5 episodes
2018	2018 MTV Movie & TV Awards	Television special
2019	2019 MTV Movie & TV Awards	Television special
