= Anatol Yusef =

British actor (born 1978)

- Born: 1978 or 1979 (age 47–48); London, England
- Education: Bristol Old Vic Theatre School
- Occupation: Actor
- Website: https://www.anatolyusef.com

Anatol Yusef (born 1978 or 1979) is an English film, television and stage actor. He is best known for his work at the Royal Shakespeare Company, his portrayal of Meyer Lansky in the television series Boardwalk Empire, and Channel 4's Southcliffe.

== Biography ==
Yusef was born in Barking, London, England. He is of Turkish descent, and his family traveled widely, visiting many different countries and cultures, including visits to Turkey every two years. He attended the Chigwell School in Chigwell, Essex, from 1986 to 1996.

As a teenager, Yusef found early work in television shows including Jeeves and Wooster, Grange Hill, and The Young Indiana Jones Chronicles. He appeared in the films Batman and Aliens (director's cut). He received the country’s highest marks in GCSE and A-Level Drama studies which awarded him a scholarship from Essex County Council for Acting School. He then trained at the Bristol Old Vic Theatre School. While training he worked on the television show Thief Takers and was a finalist in the BBC Carleton Hobbs Radio Award.

Upon graduating drama school in 2000, Yusef was offered a role in Fred Schepisi's award-winning film Last Orders, playing the younger self of Bob Hoskins' "Ray" and working with British actors Sir Michael Caine, Dame Helen Mirren, Ray Winstone, David Hemmings, and Tom Courtenay.

He became a resident company member with the Royal Shakespeare Company. In the RSC's production of King Lear, Nicholas de Jongh of the London Evening Standard claimed "Anatol Yusef's tremendous Cornwall, the best [he] [had] ever seen".

In 2006, Yusef's performance as Mercutio in Bill Bryden's Romeo and Juliet at the Birmingham Rep was heralded as "sparkl[ing]"

In 2008, Yusef appeared in the title role in a New York off-off Broadway production of Richard III, and was described by Backstage as "a superlative actor" and "magnetic". Yusef has since remained in New York City. In Manhattan in 2009, he co-founded and served as joint artistic director of Fixitsolife Theatre Company, producing notable productions of Proof and A Science of Guilt with Italian theatre director Francesco Campari. He has worked throughout New York, in 2011 appearing in A Movement of the Soul, playing Thomas Hopkins Gallaudet, for which he learned American Sign Language. In 2012, he appeared in José Rivera’s “Massacre (Sing to Your Children)” and received special mention by David Rooney in The New York Times for his role as Joe.

In 2010 he was cast as Meyer Lansky in HBO's Boardwalk Empire, first appearing in Episode 7 of Season 1, "Home" and remained throughout the series. In an interview with The Morton Report, Yusef described Lansky as self-educated, a massively intelligent overachiever and "a ruthless, ruthless man". Anatol's characterization of Mr. Lansky has been recognized in many publications, including from author and critic Clive James's article in Prospect magazine, "American God" where he describes Yusef’s as “the most impressive performance in the show,” as well as Michael Noble's review of the show on Den of Geek.

In 2014 he appeared in a central ensemble including, Rory Kinnear, Shirley Henderson, Sean Harris, and Eddie Marsan, in Channel 4's BAFTA-nominated Southcliffe, receiving special mention in an article by IndieWire on the best TV episodes of 2014.

In 2016, Yusef narrated the European championship series on Howler Radio, a collection of five podcast narratives written by a selection football journalists, the most popular being "The Summer Football Came Home".

In 2017, he appeared as Laertes and the Player King in Sam Gold’s Hamlet at the Public Theatre with Oscar Isaac in the title role. He received unilaterally excellent reviews including, Marilyn Stasio of Variety who stated that “he makes his presence felt in a riveting performance” and Ben Brantley of The New York Times added that he “is splendid as a pugilistic Laertes and a lyrical Player King.” Helen Shaw also commented that Anatol “does a speech as the Player that runs rings around the stars nearby.”

In 2018, Anatol starred as King Leontes in Arin Arbus’ production of The Winter’s Tale at Theatre for a New Audience, again receiving positive reviews. Off Off Online praised him as “completely convincing, masterly in the language and commanding a range of emotions.” Jesse Green of The New York Times called the production terrific and haled Anatol’s performance.

Anatol was last seen on stage playing opposite Elizabeth McGovern in the two-hander Ava: The Secret Conversations, directed by Gaby Dellal, and written by McGovern. His portrayal of biographer Peter Evans as well as turns as Frank Sinatra, Mickey Rooney, and Artie Shaw were described as "capturing the essence of Ava’s trio of lovers with an interesting character performance that really brings the story to life.”

== Filmography ==
=== Film ===
| Year | Title | Role | Notes |
|---|---|---|---|
| 2001 | Last Orders | Young Ray | |
| 2003 | Ten Minutes | Peter | Short |
| 2003 | The Gathering | The Gathering | |
| 2006 | O Jerusalem | Major Tell | |
| 2009 | The Reward | Felix | Short |
| 2011 | Corner Shop | Danny | Short |
| 2016 | Bastille Day | Tom Luddy | |
| 2024 | You can't Win | Dirty Dick | |
| 2023 | Day of the Fight | | |

=== Television ===
| Year | Title | Role | |
|---|---|---|---|
| 1990, 1992 | Jeeves and Wooster | Sydney Blumenfield | Seasons 1 and 3 |
| 1993 | The Young Indiana Jones Chronicles | Hubert Van Hook | Episode: "Benares, January 1910" |
| 1995 | Grange Hill | Mark | Episode #18.4 |
| 1999 | Thief Takers | Aziz | Episode: "Shadows" |
| 2000 | Second Sight: Kingdom of the Blind | Sandwich Shop Owner | TV movie |
| 2002, 2006 | The Bill | Rick Lessalles, Kevin Mann | 2 episodes |
| 2003 | Trial & Retribution | PC Barry Skinner | 2 episodes |
| 2003 | The Afternoon Play: Turkish Delight | Ahmed | |
| 2010–2014 | Boardwalk Empire | Meyer Lansky | 31 episodes |
| 2013 | Southcliffe | Paul Gould | TV miniseries |
| 2016 | Preacher | Deblanc | Season 1 |

== Theatre ==
| Year | Title | Role | Notes |
|---|---|---|---|
| 2000 | The Mysteries | Herod/Cain | |
| 2000 | Under Milk Wood | Rev. Eli Jenkins, Dai Bread | |
| 2000 | After Miss Julie | John | |
| 2002 | Blackbird | Sarhad | |
| 2004 | Best of Motives | Ahmed | |
| 2005 | King Lear | Duke of Cornwall | |
| 2005 | Romeo and Juliet | Sampson | |
| 2005 | Macbeth | Banquo | |
| 2006 | Romeo and Juliet | Mercutio | |
| 2007 | Startled Response | Umut | |
| 2008 | Richard III | Richard III | |
| 2009 | Moonlight | Jake | |
| 2010 | Proof | Hal | |
| 2010 | The Science of Guilt | Kevin | |
| 2011 | A Movement of the Soul | Thomas Hopkins Gallaudet | |
| 2012 | Massacre (Sing to Your Children) | Joe | |
| 2017 | Hamlet | Laertes, The Player King | |
| 2018 | The Winter's Tale | Leontes | |
| 2022 | Ava: The Secret Conversations | Peter Evans, Frank Sinatra, Mickey Rooney, Artie Shaw | |
