= Nelson Van Alden =

Agent Nelson Van Alden
- Boardwalk Empire character
- First appearance: "Boardwalk Empire"
- Last appearance: "Devil You Know"
- Portrayed by: Michael Shannon

In-universe information
- Full name: Nelson Kasper Van Alden
- Alias: George Mueller
- Occupation: Agent of Bureau of Prohibition (seasons 1 and 2); Clothes iron salesman (season 3); Enforcer for Dean O'Banion (seasons 3 and 4); Enforcer for Al Capone (season 5)
- Spouses: Rose Van Alden (?-1921); Sigrid Mueller (1921-1931)
- Significant others: Lucy Danziger (1920-1921)
- Children: Abigail, Chester
- Nationality: American

Nelson Kasper Van Alden (alias George Mueller) is a fictional character on the HBO television series Boardwalk Empire, portrayed by Michael Shannon. He is a puritanical, repressed, religious fundamentalist and agent for the Bureau of Prohibition.

== Biography ==
There is not much known about Nelson Van Alden's childhood, but in season 2 he explained that his parents believed that the second coming of Jesus Christ would occur in 1892. In preparation for this, they sold off the family farm and began living out of a tent in order to emulate the poverty of Jesus and thus gain his favor. These experiences led to a permanent estrangement between Van Alden and his parents and he eventually abandoned them to work his way back up into a prosperous life and marriage, eventually becoming an agent of the new United States Bureau of Prohibition.

At the start of the series, Nelson Van Alden acts as Nucky Thompson's (Steve Buscemi) primary antagonist as he takes the lead to bring the kingpin down. In the midst of trying to tackle one of Prohibition's most notorious bootleggers, Van Alden's volatile temper and self-loathing start to blur his ethics and by the end of Season 1 he has killed his corrupt partner Agent Eric Sebso (Erik Wiener) and violated his religious values through a one-night stand with Nucky Thompson's ex-mistress (whom he accidentally impregnates).

Season 2 follows Van Alden's fruitless efforts to conceal his crimes. Van Alden forces the ex-mistress to stay in his apartment to give birth to their child. He also forces them to keep the pregnancy a secret and is highly controlling towards her in the meantime. The season ends with Van Alden discovering he has been named the prime suspect in Sebso's murder, and he spends Season 3 on the run with his infant daughter and nanny Sigrid (Christiane Seidel) (with whom he later fathers a son), eventually settling in Chicago under the alias George Mueller.

Alden starts work as a home appliance salesman but gets mocked and abused by his coworkers for his inability to make any sales. Nelson finally snaps and uses an iron to burn the face of one of his tormentors; months later, when the man and his friends jump Van Alden in an alley to get revenge, he pulls a gun and kills all three of them. By the end of Season 3, Van Alden resorts to hiring himself out as an enforcer for Dean O'Banion (Arron Shiver) and eventually Al Capone (Stephen Graham), still going by the name George Mueller to avoid the authorities.

The final season sees Van Alden struggling to keep the life of associate/muscle George Mueller balanced during his second failing marriage, this time to Sigrid. Van Alden has since partnered with Thompson's brother Eli (Shea Whigham) who knows Van Alden's true identity. Mike Malone (Louis Cancelmi), an undercover agent in Capone's crew, who goes by the alias Mike D'Angelo, recognizes Van Alden and both he and Eli agree to work with Malone to help take Capone down. Van Alden also learns that Eli is having an affair with Sigrid. Eli and Van Alden eventually return to Capone's hotel to steal ledgers as proof of his tax evasion, but Capone's brother Ralph (Domenick Lombardozzi) becomes suspicious of their behavior.

The Capone brothers confront them with Malone present, unaware Malone is working undercover. With Van Alden's deteriorating home life and facing death at the hands of the Capones, he snaps and attacks the brothers while Eli and Malone watch in shock. In a rage, Van Alden begins to confess his true identity while choking Al Capone but before he can strangle him, Malone shoots and kills Van Alden. The Capones then foolishly entrust Malone with the ledgers. Van Alden's death unwittingly leads to Capone going to prison for tax evasion.

== Reception ==
Nelson Van Alden has been frequently cited as a fan-favorite on Boardwalk Empire. The role earned Shannon critical acclaim and received three nominations for the Screen Actors Guild Awards.

Despite starring on the series for all five seasons, Shannon claims to only have watched a "little bit" of the show.
