= Jimmy Darmody =

- Boardwalk Empire character
- Jimmy Darmody in a promo image for the season 1 episode "Belle Femme".
- First appearance: "Boardwalk Empire"
- Last appearance: "To the Lost"
- Created by: Terence Winter
- Portrayed by: Michael Pitt

In-universe information
- Full name: James Edison Darmody
- Nicknames: Princeton; Jimmy Irish
- Gender: Male
- Occupation: Gangster bootlegger
- Family: Gillian Darmody (mother); Louis Kaestner (father)
- Spouse: Angela Darmody (1915-1916; 1920-1921)
- Significant other: Pearl (1920)
- Children: Tommy Darmody
- Nationality: Irish-American

James Edison Darmody is a fictional character in the television show Boardwalk Empire, played by Michael Pitt. He is one of the main characters in the first two seasons of the series. Unlike most of the other main characters in the series, Jimmy is not based on a historical figure, even though he may be inspired by Atlantic City politician and Atlantic City political boss Nucky Johnson's protégé, James H. "Jimmy" Boyd. Pitt is also the only actor besides Steve Buscemi to appear in every episode for which he is credited.

== Fictional biography ==
Jimmy is the son of Atlantic City political boss Commodore Louis Kaestner (Dabney Coleman) and showgirl Gillian Darmody (Gretchen Mol). His mother was only 13 at the time of his birth, while his father was 54. The Commodore's protégé, Enoch "Nucky" Thompson (Steve Buscemi), arranged for the Commodore to rape Gillian in return for being promoted to Sheriff of Atlantic City. Jimmy was raised by his mother with support from Nucky, who became a father figure to Jimmy; the Commodore was indifferent to his son. Nucky eventually took over the Commodore's political machine and set Jimmy up for great success when he grew up. Jimmy went to Princeton University, where he met his future wife, Angela (Aleksa Palladino). He left school to fight in World War I, leaving behind his pregnant girlfriend. In Season 2, it is revealed that he joined the Army because he felt guilty about a drunken sexual encounter with his mother and because he likely faced expulsion from college after assaulting a professor who had made a pass at her. Jimmy was stationed in France fighting on the Western Front against Germany. His leg was wounded by fragments from a German grenade, leaving him with a permanent limp.

=== Season one ===
In January 1920, Jimmy has recently moved back to Atlantic City after recovering from his war injury. He displays signs of post-traumatic stress disorder from memories of the trench warfare and refuses to go back to school. He ends up working for Nucky as his driver and bodyguard. Frustrated that he is not doing more, he and Al Capone (Stephen Graham) hijack a shipment of bootlegged liquor that Nucky sold to Arnold Rothstein (Michael Stuhlbarg) and gun down the drivers. One of them survives long enough to identify Jimmy, but Nucky gets him out of trouble by blaming the hijacking on the deceased Hans Schroeder (Joseph Sikora) and sending Jimmy to Chicago. There, he works for Johnny Torrio (Greg Antonacci) alongside Capone. When Nucky faces trouble back home from Philadelphia gangsters hired by Rothstein, he takes Jimmy back into his operation.

While visiting a military hospital in Chicago, Jimmy meets Richard Harrow (Jack Huston), a disfigured marksman. They become close friends, with Richard becoming Jimmy's main ally in bootlegging. Jimmy tasks Richard with killing a gangster who had disfigured Pearl, a prostitute Jimmy was fond of, who become addicted to laudanum as a result of the attack and ultimately committed suicide while in Jimmy's care. Jimmy reconciles with his father after the Commodore survives a poisoning attempt. Jimmy is deeply hurt when he finds out that it was Nucky who arranged for the rape of his mother by his father, and plots with his father and Nucky's brother Eli (Shea Whigham) to take back control of Atlantic City from Nucky.

=== Season two ===
By the beginning of season two, Jimmy is married to Angela, with whom he raises their son, Tommy. The Commodore has the New Jersey District Attorney's office arrest Nucky for electoral fraud and recruits Nucky's political allies. He and Jimmy then work on controlling the illegal alcohol being made and sold in Atlantic City. When the Commodore suffers a stroke, Jimmy takes over his operations. Jimmy is put in a difficult position when his partners in the bootlegging business — Capone, Lucky Luciano (Vincent Piazza) and Meyer Lansky (Anatol Yusef) — pressure him to kill Nucky. Though hesitant, Jimmy agrees to order Nucky's assassination. Nucky is shot in the hand, but Clifford Lathorp kills the assassin before he can finish Nucky off. Jimmy is left wondering if he is doing the right thing.

Jimmy enters a deal with Philadelphia gangster Manny Horvitz (William Forsythe) to supply him alcohol. Jimmy is short on cash and demands a $5,000 advance. However, Nucky has Owen Sleater (Charlie Cox), a former IRA assassin, blow up the warehouse where Jimmy's liquor is stored. Jimmy finds himself with no alcohol and thus no way to pay his debts. He ends up buying medicinal alcohol from George Remus (Glenn Fleshler) and uses it to make whiskey.

Nucky resigns as Treasurer of Atlantic County, and offers his surrender to Jimmy. However, this is all a part of Nucky's power-play. He has Chalky White (Michael K. Williams), the leader of the black community in Atlantic City, to get all the black workers in the city to go on strike. The strike cripples the tourist economy that the city runs on. With help from Owen, Nucky then buys whiskey from Ireland and starts selling it in Atlantic City. Nucky's bootlegging operation flourishes, while Jimmy and his partners are left with an inferior product and nobody to sell it to.

Meanwhile, Jimmy grows tired of Horvitz asking him to repay his debts, and contacts Horvitz's rival Waxey Gordon (Nick Sandow) to have him killed. A few days later, Waxey's henchman attempts to kill Horvitz in his shop, and manages to wound him, but Horvitz fights back and kills the assailant by sinking a meat cleaver into his head. Figuring out Jimmy is responsible from a matchbook in the dead man's pocket, Horvitz plots his revenge. Torturing Mickey for an address, Horvitz breaks into Jimmy's house, expecting to find him there. Since Jimmy is out of town, he instead finds Angela with her lesbian lover and shoots them both. Jimmy is devastated, and dulls the pain with alcohol and heroin. He attacks his mother when she talks about Angela's death nonchalantly. When the Commodore comes to Gillian's defense, Jimmy kills his own father, partially at Gillian's urging.

Jimmy tries to make amends with Nucky, and he and Harrow help him with his election fraud case by killing the main witness for the prosecution, Alderman Jim Neary (Robert Clohessy), and staging it to look like a suicide. After the case ends in a mistrial, Nucky calls Jimmy and tells him that he has kidnapped Horvitz. However, Jimmy knows that he is being lured to his death, and willingly goes unarmed to see Nucky. Jimmy tells Nucky that he truly died during the war, and even tries to talk him through the mechanics of shooting someone. Nucky shoots him twice in the head, killing him.

=== Season three ===
Sixteen months after Jimmy's death, Nucky has a nightmare where he shoots an adolescent Jimmy below the eye (the same place Nucky had actually shot him). By the beginning of season three, Gillian has not had Jimmy declared legally dead and runs the Commodore's mansion in Jimmy's absence. She turns the house into a high-class brothel and raises Tommy as her own. She eventually kills a man who resembles Jimmy and uses his body in place of Jimmy's, giving her control of the Commodore's estate until Tommy is an adult.

=== Season four ===
In the season four finale, set two years after Jimmy's death, Gillian is put on trial for the murder of the man she claimed was her son in season three. Richard, trying to keep Tommy out of her custody, testifies against her. However, without a body, Gillian faces little chance of getting convicted. Richard then strikes a deal with Nucky to anonymously tip off where Jimmy was buried. Jimmy's corpse is dug up and Gillian is convicted of murder.

== Ending ==
Series creator and showrunner Terence Winter said he always planned on killing off Jimmy, but did not think it would happen so soon in the series. Originally, Jimmy was supposed to survive after season two. The storyline was changed when Dabney Coleman, who played the Commodore, was being treated for cancer during filming. In order to accommodate Coleman's condition, the Commodore's screen time was reduced and Jimmy became the replacement leader of the rebellion against Nucky. The further they got in the writing process, the more the writers realized that Nucky killing Jimmy was the only logical conclusion to the story.

Winter has said that the decision to kill off Jimmy was made at the beginning of Season 2. "The idea was to try and push things to their absolute limit, even if it makes it difficult for yourself and your writing team. If you take things to their logical extreme with the situation we created, Jimmy has betrayed Nucky, he tried to have him killed. You want to be honest about the storytelling. In the pilot, Jimmy told Nucky: 'You can’t be half a gangster anymore.' We wanted with the first two seasons to follow that trajectory, where he goes full season from being the guy who doesn't want to get his hands dirty to actually pulling the trigger himself. And what's the strongest version of that? To pull the trigger on the very guy who told him, 'You can’t be half a gangster anymore.' It's like, 'Guess what? You're right. I can't. And here's me now fully becoming a gangster.' Anything short of Nucky doing it himself wouldn't feel real, it wouldn't be real. And it would be a cheat for us to say, 'We want to keep our beloved character Jimmy Darmody alive.'"

Winter stated that his goal was to mislead the audience into thinking Jimmy and Nucky would reconcile and there would be a happy ending. "I wanted them to think right up to the very end that Nucky is going to forgive him and take him back. It was a really hard decision. You’re sort of blowing up your own show, in some ways. Now we’re back in the writers room trying to figure out where we go from here without Jimmy Darmody."

In October 2011, Pitt's agent fired him, saying that he was "really difficult on set and otherwise." After the season two finale, rumors began circulating that Jimmy was killed off because Pitt was difficult to work with. Both Pitt and Winter have denied this.

== Reception ==
Michael Pitt, along with the rest of the cast of Boardwalk Empire, won the Screen Actors Guild Award for Outstanding Performance by an Ensemble in a Drama Series in 2010 and 2011. Pitt was also nominated for a Monte-Carlo Television Festival Award for Outstanding Actor in a Drama Series.

Soon after the show's debut, the Los Angeles Times reported an increased demand for Jimmy's hairstyle — a trimmed buzz-cut short on the sides, left long on the top and swept back from the forehead — at barber shops in the United States. The show's particular take on the style along with a number of variations, oft described as an "undercut", remained popular for over a decade afterwards, long outlasting the character's time on the show and the run of the program itself.
