= List of United States Supreme Court cases, volume 273 =

Supreme Court of the United States
- Interactive map of Supreme Court of the United States
- 38°53′26″N 77°00′16″W
- Established: March 4, 1789; 236 years ago
- Location: Washington, D.C.
- Coordinates: 38°53′26″N 77°00′16″W
- Composition method: Presidential nomination with Senate confirmation
- Authorised by: Constitution of the United States, Art. III, § 1
- Judge term length: life tenure, subject to impeachment and removal
- Number of positions: 9 (by statute)
- Website: supremecourt.gov

This is a list of cases reported in volume 273 of United States Reports, decided by the Supreme Court of the United States in 1927.

== Justices of the Supreme Court at the time of volume 273 U.S. ==
The Supreme Court is established by Article III, Section 1 of the Constitution of the United States, which says: "The judicial Power of the United States, shall be vested in one supreme Court . . .". The size of the Court is not specified; the Constitution leaves it to Congress to set the number of justices. Under the Judiciary Act of 1789 Congress originally fixed the number of justices at six (one chief justice and five associate justices). Since 1789 Congress has varied the size of the Court from six to seven, nine, ten, and back to nine justices (always including one chief justice).

When the cases in volume 273 were decided the Court comprised the following nine members:

Portrait	Justice	Office	Home State	Succeeded	Date confirmed by the Senate (Vote)	Tenure on Supreme Court
	William Howard Taft	Chief Justice	Connecticut	Edward Douglass White	June 30, 1921 (Acclamation)	July 11, 1921 – February 3, 1930 (Retired)
	Oliver Wendell Holmes Jr.	Associate Justice	Massachusetts	Horace Gray	December 4, 1902 (Acclamation)	December 8, 1902 – January 12, 1932 (Retired)
	Willis Van Devanter	Associate Justice	Wyoming	Edward Douglass White (as Associate Justice)	December 15, 1910 (Acclamation)	January 3, 1911 – June 2, 1937 (Retired)
	James Clark McReynolds	Associate Justice	Tennessee	Horace Harmon Lurton	August 29, 1914 (44–6)	October 12, 1914 – January 31, 1941 (Retired)
	Louis Brandeis	Associate Justice	Massachusetts	Joseph Rucker Lamar	June 1, 1916 (47–22)	June 5, 1916 – February 13, 1939 (Retired)
	George Sutherland	Associate Justice	Utah	John Hessin Clarke	September 5, 1922 (Acclamation)	October 2, 1922 – January 17, 1938 (Retired)
	Pierce Butler	Associate Justice	Minnesota	William R. Day	December 21, 1922 (61–8)	January 2, 1923 – November 16, 1939 (Died)
	Edward Terry Sanford	Associate Justice	Tennessee	Mahlon Pitney	January 29, 1923 (Acclamation)	February 19, 1923 – March 8, 1930 (Died)
	Harlan F. Stone	Associate Justice	New York	Joseph McKenna	February 5, 1925 (71–6)	March 2, 1925 – July 2, 1941 (Continued as chief justice)

== Notable Cases in 273 U.S. ==
=== McGrain v. Daugherty ===
McGrain v. Daugherty, 273 U.S. 135 (1927), was a challenge to Mally Daugherty's contempt conviction and arrest, which happened when he failed to appear before a Senate committee investigating the failure of his brother, Attorney General Harry Daugherty, to investigate the perpetrators of the Teapot Dome Scandal. The Supreme Court upheld his conviction, holding for the first time that under the Constitution, Congress has the power to compel witnesses to appear and provide testimony.

=== Farrington v. Tokushige ===
Farrington v. Tokushige, 273 U.S. 284 (1927), was a case in which the Supreme Court struck down the Territory of Hawaii's statute making it illegal for schools to teach foreign languages without a permit, as it violated the due process clause of the Fifth Amendment.

=== Tumey v. Ohio ===
In Tumey v. Ohio, 273 U.S. 510 (1927), the Supreme Court struck down an Ohio law that financially rewarded public officials for successfully prosecuting cases related to Prohibition. The Court's decision in this case continues to provide precedent today in many cases involving judicial impartiality.

=== Nixon v. Herndon ===
Nixon v. Herndon, 273 U.S. 536 (1927), is a United States Supreme Court decision striking down a 1923 Texas law forbidding blacks from voting in the Texas Democratic Party primary. Due to the limited amount of Republican Party activity in Texas at the time following the suppression of black voting through poll taxes, the Democratic Party primary was essentially the only competitive process and chance to choose candidates for the Senate, House of Representatives and state offices. This case was one of four supported by the National Association for the Advancement of Colored People (NAACP) that challenged the Texas Democratic Party's all-white primary, which was finally prohibited in the Supreme Court ruling Smith v. Allwright in 1944.

== Citation style ==
Under the Judiciary Act of 1789 the federal court structure at the time comprised District Courts, which had general trial jurisdiction; Circuit Courts, which had mixed trial and appellate (from the US District Courts) jurisdiction; and the United States Supreme Court, which had appellate jurisdiction over the federal District and Circuit courts—and for certain issues over state courts. The Supreme Court also had limited original jurisdiction (i.e., in which cases could be filed directly with the Supreme Court without first having been heard by a lower federal or state court). There were one or more federal District Courts and/or Circuit Courts in each state, territory, or other geographical region.

The Judiciary Act of 1891 created the United States Courts of Appeals and reassigned the jurisdiction of most routine appeals from the district and circuit courts to these appellate courts. The Act created nine new courts that were originally known as the "United States Circuit Courts of Appeals." The new courts had jurisdiction over most appeals of lower court decisions. The Supreme Court could review either legal issues that a court of appeals certified or decisions of court of appeals by writ of certiorari. On January 1, 1912, the effective date of the Judicial Code of 1911, the old Circuit Courts were abolished, with their remaining trial court jurisdiction transferred to the U.S. District Courts.

Bluebook citation style is used for case names, citations, and jurisdictions.

- "# Cir." = United States Court of Appeals
  - e.g., "3d Cir." = United States Court of Appeals for the Third Circuit
- "D." = United States District Court for the District of . . .
  - e.g.,"D. Mass." = United States District Court for the District of Massachusetts
- "E." = Eastern; "M." = Middle; "N." = Northern; "S." = Southern; "W." = Western
  - e.g.,"M.D. Ala." = United States District Court for the Middle District of Alabama
- "Ct. Cl." = United States Court of Claims
- The abbreviation of a state's name alone indicates the highest appellate court in that state's judiciary at the time.
  - e.g.,"Pa." = Supreme Court of Pennsylvania
  - e.g.,"Me." = Supreme Judicial Court of Maine

== List of cases in volume 273 U.S. ==
Case Name	Page and year	Opinion of the Court	Concurring opinion(s)	Dissenting opinion(s)	Lower Court	Disposition
Albrecht v. United States	1 (1927)	Brandeis	none	none	E.D. Ill.	affirmed
Florida v. Mellon	12 (1927)	Sutherland	none	none	original	filing denied
Myers v. Hurley Motor Company	18 (1927)	Sutherland	none	none	D.C. Cir.	certification
Byars v. United States	28 (1927)	Sutherland	none	none	8th Cir.	reversed
Di Santo v. Pennsylvania	34 (1927)	Butler	none	Brandeis; Stone	Pa.	reversed
Interstate Busses Corporation v. Holyoke Street Railway Company	45 (1927)	Butler	none	none	D. Mass.	affirmed
Federal Trade Commission v. Pacific States Paper Trade Association	52 (1927)	Butler	none	none	9th Cir.	multiple
Maguire and Company v. United States	67 (1927)	Sanford	none	none	Ct. Cl.	affirmed
Liberty Warehouse Company v. Grannis	70 (1927)	Sanford	none	none	E.D. Ky.	affirmed
Wong Tai v. United States	77 (1927)	Sanford	none	none	N.D. Cal.	affirmed
Public Utilities Commission of Rhode Island v. Attleboro Steam and Electric Company	83 (1927)	Sanford	none	none	R.I.	affirmed
McGuire v. United States	95 (1927)	Stone	none	none	2d Cir.	certification
Goodyear Tire and Rubber Company v. United States	100 (1927)	Stone	none	none	Ct. Cl.	reversed
United States ex rel. Vajtauer v. Commissioner of Immigration	103 (1927)	Stone	none	none	S.D.N.Y.	affirmed
Waggoner Estate v. Wichita County	113 (1927)	Stone	none	none	5th Cir.	affirmed
James-Dickinson Farm Mortgage Company v. Harry	119 (1927)	Brandeis	none	none	E.D. Ill.	multiple
Missouri ex rel. Wabash Railroad Company v. Missouri Public Service Commission	126 (1927)	Stone	none	none	Mo.	reversed
Mosler Safe Company v. Ely-Norris Safe Company	132 (1927)	Holmes	none	none	2d Cir.	reversed
McGrain v. Daugherty	135 (1927)	VanDevanter	none	none	S.D. Ohio	reversed
Great Northern Railroad Company v. Sutherland	182 (1927)	Brandeis	none	none	S.D.N.Y.	affirmed
Jones v. Prairie Oil and Gas Company	195 (1927)	Holmes	none	none	N.D. Okla.	affirmed
Jacob Reed's Sons v. United States	200 (1927)	Brandeis	none	none	Ct. Cl.	affirmed
United States v. Noveck	202 (1927)	Brandeis	none	none	S.D.N.Y.	reversed
Hartford Accident and Indemnity Company v. Southern Pacific Company	207 (1927)	Taft	none	none	5th Cir.	affirmed
Charleston Mining Company v. United States	220 (1927)	Taft	none	none	5th Cir.	affirmed
Barrett Company v. United States	227 (1927)	Taft	none	none	Ct. Cl.	reversed
De Forest Radio Telephone Company v. United States	236 (1927)	Taft	none	none	Ct. Cl.	affirmed
Hellmich v. Missouri Pacific Railroad Company	242 (1927)	Taft	none	none	8th Cir.	reversed
Oklahoma Natural Gas Company v. Oklahoma	257 (1927)	Taft	none	none	Okla.	substitution denied
United States v. Ritterman	261 (1927)	Holmes	none	none	2d Cir.	reversed
American Railway Express Company v. Kentucky	269 (1927)	McReynolds	none	none	Ky.	affirmed
American Railway Express Company v. Royster Guano Company	274 (1927)	McReynolds	none	none	Va. Sp. Ct. App.	affirmed
Louisiana and Western Railroad Company v. Gardiner	280 (1927)	McReynolds	none	none	La. Cir. Ct. App.	reversed
Farrington v. Tokushige	284 (1927)	McReynolds	none	none	9th Cir.	affirmed
United States v. Los Angeles and Salt Lake Railroad Company	299 (1927)	Brandeis	none	none	S.D. Cal.	reversed
Pueblo of Santa Rosa v. Fall	315 (1927)	Sutherland	none	none	D.C. Cir.	reversed
Louisville and Nashville Railroad Company v. United States	321 (1927)	Sutherland	none	none	Ct. Cl.	affirmed
Davis Sewing Machine Company v. United States	324 (1927)	Sutherland	none	none	Ct. Cl.	affirmed
Sacramento Navigation Company v. Salz	326 (1927)	Sutherland	none	none	9th Cir.	reversed
Smyer v. United States	333 (1927)	Sutherland	none	none	5th Cir.	reversed
United States v. Burton Coal Company	337 (1927)	Butler	none	none	Ct. Cl.	affirmed
Missouri Pacific Railroad Company v. Porter	341 (1927)	Butler	none	none	Ark.	reversed
Bowers v. New York and Albany Lighterage Company	346 (1927)	Butler	none	none	2d Cir.	affirmed
Quon Quon Poy v. Johnson	352 (1927)	Sanford	none	none	D. Mass.	affirmed
Eastman Kodak Company of New York v. Southern Photo Materials Company	359 (1927)	Sanford	none	none	5th Cir.	affirmed
Myers v. International Trust Company	380 (1927)	Sanford	none	none	Mass. Super. Ct.	affirmed
Fred T. Ley and Company, Inc. v. United States	386 (1927)	Stone	none	none	Ct. Cl.	affirmed
Smith v. Wilson	388 (1927)	Stone	none	none	S.D. Tex.	dismissed
United States v. Trenton Potteries Company	392 (1927)	Stone	none	none	2d Cir.	reversed
Swiss Oil Corporation v. Shanks	407 (1927)	Stone	none	none	Ky.	affirmed
Hayman v. City of Galveston	414 (1927)	Stone	none	none	S.D. Tex.	affirmed
Tyson and Brother v. Banton	418 (1927)	Sutherland	none	Holmes; Stone; Sanford	S.D.N.Y.	reversed
Pan American Petroleum and Transport Company v. United States	456 (1927)	Butler	none	none	9th Cir.	affirmed
Tumey v. Ohio	510 (1927)	Taft	none	none	Ohio	reversed
Nixon v. Herndon	536 (1927)	Holmes	none	none	W.D. Tex.	reversed
Ingenohl v. Olsen and Company	541 (1927)	Holmes	none	none	Phil.	reversed
Shukert v. Allen	545 (1927)	Holmes	none	none	8th Cir.	reversed
First National Bank of Hartford v. City of Hartford	548 (1927)	Stone	none	none	Wis.	reversed
Minnesota v. First National Bank of St. Paul	561 (1927)	Stone	none	none	Minn.	affirmed
Georgetown National Bank v. McFarland	568 (1927)	Stone	none	none	Ky.	affirmed
United States v. Shelby Iron Company	571 (1927)	Taft	none	none	5th Cir.	reversed
Shields v. United States	583 (1927)	Taft	none	none	3d Cir.	reversed
Kelley v. Oregon	589 (1927)	Taft	none	none	Or.	dismissed
Ford v. United States	593 (1927)	Taft	none	none	9th Cir.	affirmed
Railroad and Warehouse Commission of Minnesota v. Duluth Street Railway Company	625 (1927)	Holmes	none	none	D. Minn.	affirmed
Beech-Nut Packing Company v. P. Lorillard Company	629 (1927)	Holmes	none	none	3d Cir.	affirmed
