= United States v. Midwest Oil Co. =

- Supreme Court of the United States

Argued January 9, January 12, 1914 Reargued May 7, 1914 Decided February 23, 1915
- Full case name: United States v. Midwest Oil Company
- Docket no.: 278
- Citations: 236 U.S. 459 (more)

Case history
- Prior: Certified from the United States Court of Appeals for the Eighth Circuit

Holding
- The President may temporarily withdraw public lands for military use with the acquiescence of Congress

Court membership
- Chief Justice Edward D. White Associate Justices Joseph McKenna · Oliver W. Holmes Jr. William R. Day · Charles E. Hughes; Willis Van Devanter · Joseph R. Lamar; Mahlon Pitney · James C. McReynolds

Case opinions
- Majority: Lamar, joined by White, Holmes, Pitney, McReynolds, Hughes
- Dissent: Day, joined by McKenna, Van Devanter

Laws applied
- U.S. Const. art. IV, § 3, cl. 2

United States v. Midwest Oil Co. was a United States Supreme Court decision that upheld the President's implied power to withdraw large tracts of oil-rich public land from private exploitation, with the acquiescence of Congress, and for the purpose of preserving petroleum reserves for the United States Navy. This implied power was repealed by the Federal Land Policy and Management Act of 1976. Later, broad interpretations of Midwest Oil treated the decision as an endorsement of implied executive power beyond the limits the Court itself delineated.

== Background ==
In the late 1800s and early 1900s private citizens were allowed to claim public oil lands. Congress had declared "all public lands containing petroleum or other mineral oils" to be open for exploration and development. The ensuing oil rush in California prompted a warning from the United States Geological Survey that immediate action was needed to avoid transferring energy resources that were needed for military use.

There were concerns developing within the corridors of government about waste and overproduction in the wake of Standard Oil's dissolution. Interior Secretary Richard A. Ballinger recommended President William Howard Taft take steps to "assure the conservation of an adequate supply of petroleum for the Government's own needs". Taft issed an executive order to withdraw millions of acres of public oil lands from private use, pending congressional legislation governing petroleum resources.

== Supreme Court ==
The Court placed significant weight on the history of presidential withdrawals of public lands. For roughly eighty years, presidents had repeatedly withdrawn millions of acres of public land from private acquisition without express statutory authority:

- 99 Executive Orders establishing or enlarging Indian reservations;
- 109 Executive Orders establishing or enlarging Military reservations and setting apart land for water, timber, fuel, hay, signal stations, target ranges, and rights-of-way connected with military use; and
- 44 Executive Orders establishing bird reserves.

The Court cited these withdrawals as evidence of a longstanding executive practice of reserving public lands for governmental purposes:

The Executive, as agent, was in charge of the public domain; by a multitude of orders extending over a long period of time, and affecting vast bodies of land, in many states and territories, he withdrew large areas in the public interest. These orders were known to Congress, as principal, and in not a single instance was the act of the agent disapproved. Its acquiescence all the more readibly operated as an implied grant of power in view of the fact that its exercise was not only useful to the public, but did not interfere with any vested right of the citizen.

The Court further noted that Congress had repeatedly acquiesced in this practice, citing more than 250 executive withdrawal orders issued before 1910.

The Court's reasoning draws on a line of cases that treat longstanding governmental practice as relevant evidence in identifying the scope of federal power, particularly where text and formal delegation are unclear. In Stuart v. Laird, for example, the Court gave significant weight to “practice and acquiescence,” describing it as having “fixed the construction” of an early statutory arrangement. Later decisions such as McPherson v. Blacker, Cooley v. Board of Wardens, and Fairbank v. United States similarly suggest that “contemporaneous and continuous subsequent practical construction” may resolve ambiguity in constitutional or statutory meaning:

[I]n determining the meaning of a statute or the existence of a power, weight shall be given to the usage itself—even when the validity of the practice is the subject of investigation.

The Court said that "[p]ast practice does not, by itself, create power", however "long-continued practice, known to and acquiesced in by Congress, would raise a presumption" that the action was lawful.

=== Dissent ===
Justice William Rufus Day's dissenting opinion was joined by Joseph McKenna and Willis Van Devanter. They wrote that the President's duty under the Take Care Clause is to execute, not alter or suspend, the public land laws enacted by Congress, and distinguished earlier decisions upholding executive withdrawals as involving actions taken in furtherance of congressional policy.

== Aftermath ==
During the administration of President Warren G. Harding, the Teapot Dome scandal involved Secretary of the Interior Albert B. Fall accepting bribes from two oil companies in exchange for leases to naval petroleum reserves whose executive withdrawal had been upheld in United States v. Midwest Oil Company. To facilitate the leases, Fall proposed an executive order transferring the President's leasing authority to the Department of the Interior. Despite the objections of Theodore Roosevelt Jr., then Assistant Secretary of the Navy, Secretary of the Navy Edwin Denby forwarded the executive order to President Harding, who signed it. Fall was later convicted of accepting bribes, becoming the first U.S. cabinet secretary to serve a prison sentence for official misconduct.

Congress relied on the Midwest Oil decision to support the constitutionality of the Defense Withdrawal Act of 1958 requiring Congressional approval for military land withdrawals over 5000 acres. In 1976 the landmark Federal Land Policy and Management Act of 1976 repealed the implied presidential power upheld in Midwest Oil.

John Yoo's memorandum, The President's Constitutional Authority to Conduct Military Operations Against Terrorists and Nations Supporting Them, was issued by the Office of Legal Counsel on September 25, 2001, shortly after the September 11 attacks. It became one of the most controversial and widely discussed legal memoranda on presidential power in the modern era. Yoo and Robert J. Delahunty later adapted it into a scholarly article arguing that historical practice and acquiescence were sources of presidential authority. In support of their view, Yoo & Delahunty cited United States v. Midwest Oil Co.. Drawing on this view of presidential power, the authors argued that the President has the power to declare war unilaterally.

Although the White Court qualified that executive practice does not create presidential power without “uniform” acquiescence by Congress, in 2006 congressional testimony criticizing the permeating influence of Midwest Oil, John Dean, a former legal counselor to Richard Nixon, argued that the decision was too vague to serve as the "leading case on congressional acquiescence" and warned of executive branch lawyers taking “the most aggressive reading possible” wherever ambiguous legal authority permitted broader claims of executive power.
