= Ohio Gang =

American political clique

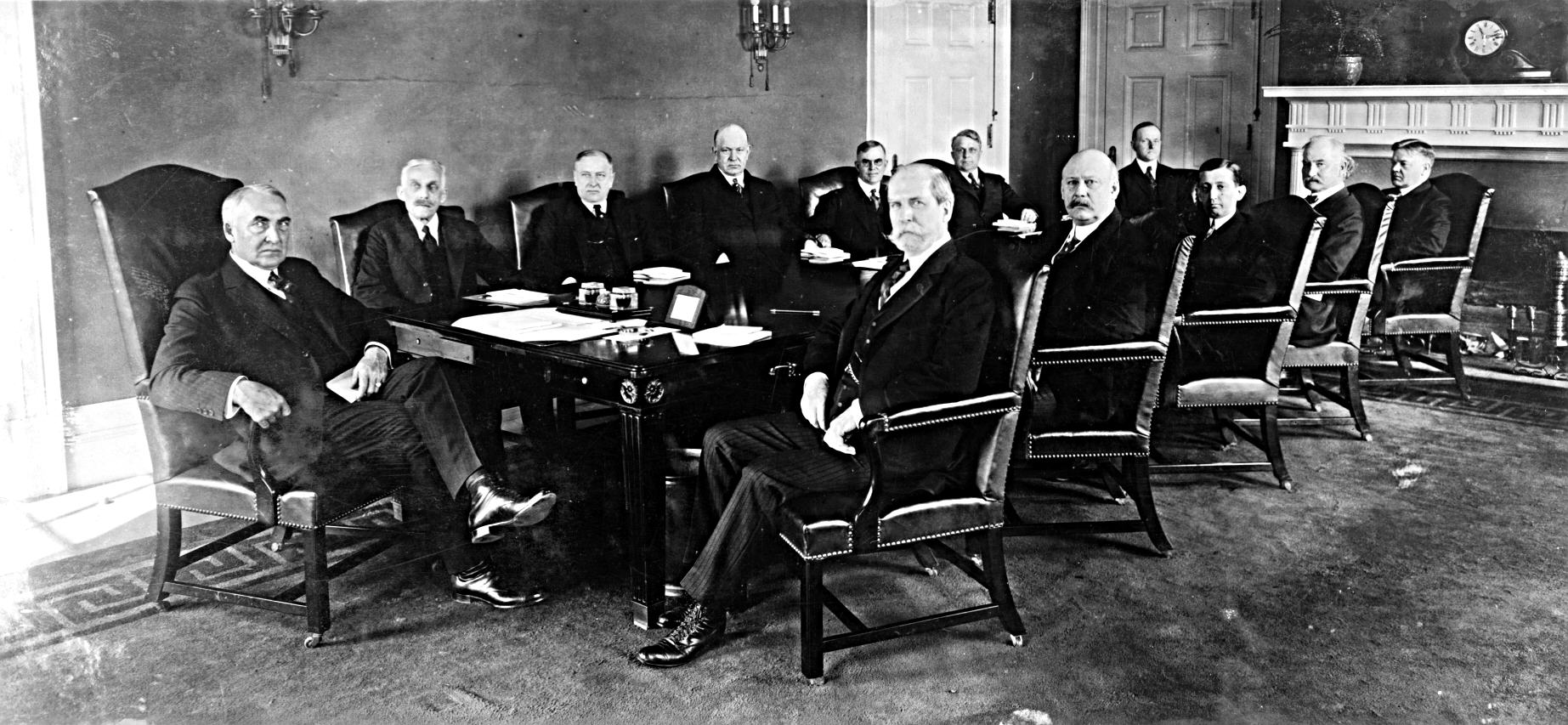
- Warren G. Harding and his cabinet, 1921
- Founded: 1886
- Founder: Joseph B. Foraker
- Founding location: Ohio
- Years active: 1886–1924
- Territory: Based in Ohio, active at national level
- Ethnicity: American citizens of European origin
- Membership: More than 10
- Leaders: Joseph B. Foraker; Warren G. Harding; Harry M. Daugherty
- Activities: Patronage, political corruption, bootlegging

The Ohio Gang was a gang of politicians and industry leaders closely surrounding Warren G. Harding, the 29th president of the United States. Many of these individuals came into Harding's personal orbit during his tenure as a state-level politician in Ohio, hence the name.

During the Harding administration, several members of the Ohio Gang became involved in financial scandals. These included the Teapot Dome scandal and apparent malfeasance at the U.S. Department of Justice, some of which ended in prison terms and a suicide. Following Harding's sudden death of a heart attack in 1923, many members of the Ohio Gang were effectively removed from the corridors of power by Harding's vice president and successor, Calvin Coolidge.

== Background ==
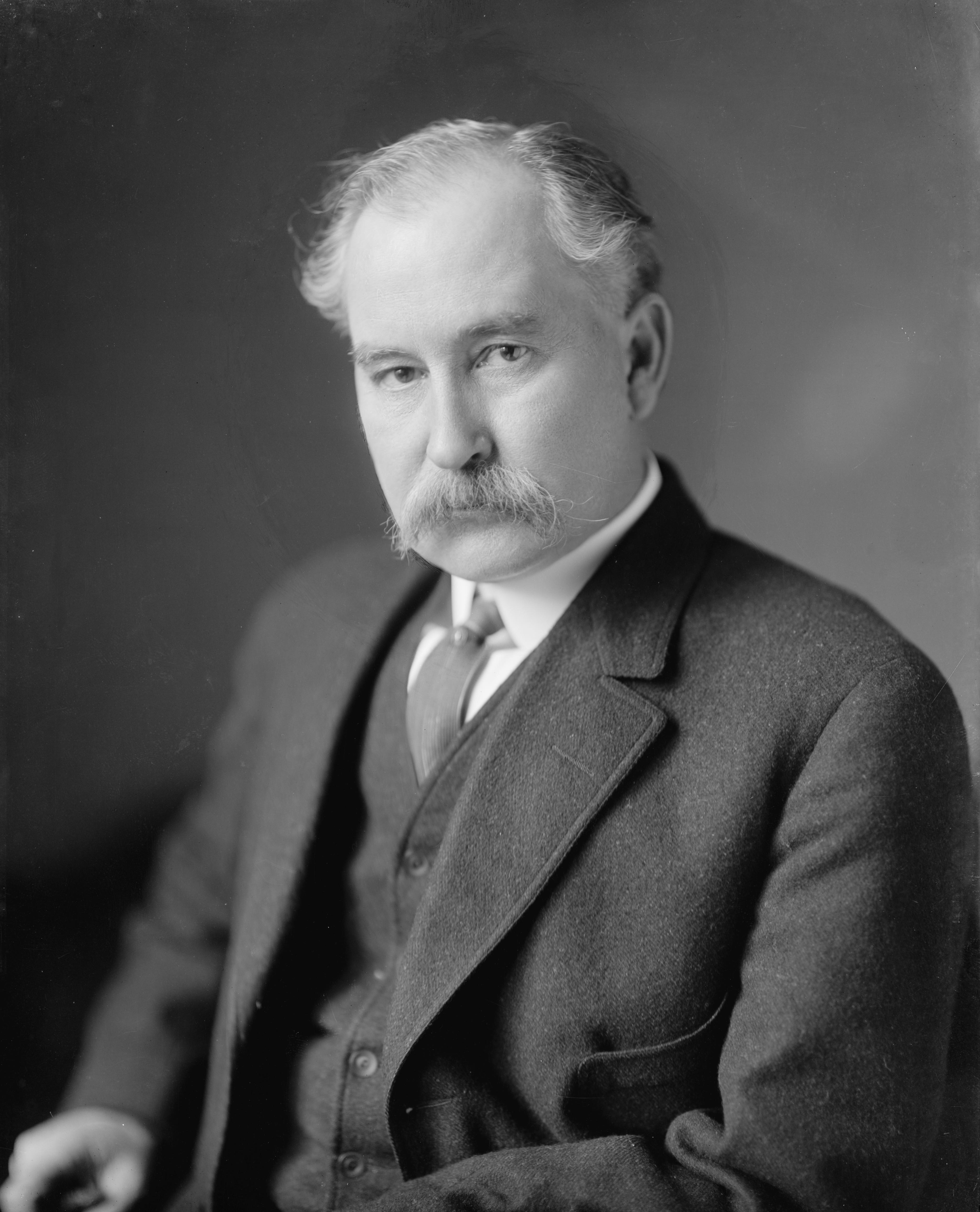
Secretary of the Interior Albert B. Fall, chief perpetrator of the Teapot Dome bribery scandal

Warren G. Harding was elected president by promising to return the nation to "normalcy", and opposing the idealism of his predecessor Woodrow Wilson. He captured 60% of Americans' votes and won by a landslide. After Harding had won the election, he appointed many of his allies and campaign contributors to powerful political positions in control of vast amounts of government money and resources.

Attorney General Harry M. Daugherty and Interior Secretary Albert B. Fall were considered to have been responsible for acts of corruption and cronyism.

Albert Fall was responsible for the Teapot Dome scandal. Teapot Dome was considered America's biggest political scandal up until Watergate. The group met regularly at the infamous Little Green House on K Street. Also associated with the secret hide out was Jesse W. Smith who was said to have committed suicide because he faced scrutiny from Harding's supporters about his activities.

There is no information that proves that Harding knew of the scandals that were going on during his time in office. He may not have learned much of it until the eve of his death. Fall was mainly responsible for the Teapot Dome scandal and was eventually jailed for taking bribes. Later President Coolidge forced the resignation of Daugherty for the same crimes.

=== Internal opposition ===
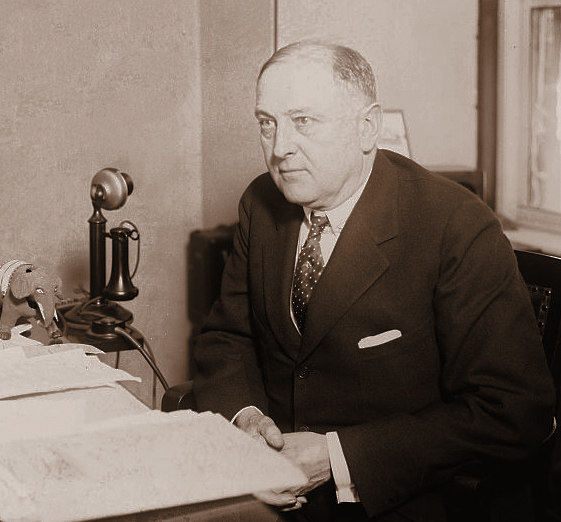
Attorney General Harry M. Daugherty, one of the leaders of the so-called Ohio Gang

Not every member of the Harding administration was a member of the so-called "Ohio Gang". Among the critics of the clique was Harding's straitlaced Secretary of Commerce, Herbert Hoover, who while generally appreciative of Harding viewed the motivations and behavior of the Ohio Gang with thinly concealed disgust.

In his memoirs, published in 1952, Hoover depicted Harding's Ohio cronies as a reflection of a character flaw:

[Harding] had another side which was not good. His political associates had been men of the type of Albert B. Fall, whom he appointed Secretary of the Interior; Daugherty, whom he appointed Attorney General; Forbes, whom he appointed Director of the Veterans' Bureau; Thomas W. Miller, whom he appointed Alien Property Custodian, and Jesse W. "Jess" Smith who had office room in the Department of Justice.
He enjoyed the company of these men and his old Ohio associates in and out of the government. Weekly White House poker parties were his greatest relaxation. The stakes were not large, but the play lasted most of the night.... I had lived too long on the frontiers of the world to have strong emotions against people playing poker for money if they liked it, but it irked me to see it in the White House.

Although the religious Hoover was invited to the White House poker party only once and never invited back, he was nevertheless held in esteem by Harding, and he was abruptly added to the entourage for the President's July 1923 trip to Alaska, which came in the wake of Jess Smith's suicide.

Even as Harding prepared to leave Washington, D.C., Hoover found him "nervous and distraught", and his mood changed little on board ship to Alaska. Hoover later recalled:

One day after lunch when we were a few days out, Harding asked me to come to his cabin. He plumped at me the question: "If you knew of a great scandal in our administration, would you for the good of the country and the party expose it publicly or would you bury it?" My natural reply was "Publish it, and at least get credit for integrity on your side." He remarked that this method might be politically dangerous. I asked for more particulars. He said that he had received some rumors of irregularities, centering around Smith, in connection with cases in the Department of Justice. He had followed the matter up and finally sent for Smith. After a painful session he told Smith that he would be arrested in the morning. Smith went home, burned all his papers, and committed suicide. Harding gave me no information about what Smith had been up to. I asked what Daugherty's relations to the affair were. He abruptly dried up and never raised the question again.

During his Alaskan trip Harding suffered the first heart attack in what would prove to be his last days. Following Harding's death, Hoover and his co-thinker, Secretary of State Charles Evans Hughes, approached new President Calvin Coolidge and asked him to remove prominent Ohio Gang member Daugherty as Attorney General. Harding's death had done nothing to stem the tide of emerging scandals revolving around his Ohio clique, with the news dominated by the story of Teapot Dome bribery and allegations of wrongdoing in the Office of the Alien Property Custodian, the Veterans' Bureau, and the Office of the Attorney General.

Hoover recalled:

Coolidge was loath to believe that such things were possible. He greatly delayed the removal of Daugherty from the Cabinet. From this man's long-time character, he should never have been in any government.... Coolidge had a high sense of justice and asserted that he had no definite knowledge of wrongdoings by Daugherty and could not remove him on rumors. We urged that Daugherty had lost the confidence of the whole country and himself should be willing to retire for the good of public service.

Finally, on March 28, 1924, Coolidge requested and received a letter of resignation from Daugherty, effectively terminating the Ohio Gang's last leading member.

The term "Ohio Gang", while used as an epithet by some during the decade of the 1920s and subsequently, was embraced by others. In his 1932 memoir Harry Daugherty unabashedly declared:

I was a true son of Ohio, the battle ground of the Nation. I frankly confess to a leadership in the so-called 'Ohio Gang' for about forty years. On the lips of rival politicians the 'Ohio Gang' is an epithet. I wear its badge as a mark of honor.

== Members ==
- Joseph B. Foraker
- Warren G. Harding
- Harry M. Daugherty
- Jesse Smith
- George Remus (associate)
- Albert B. Fall (from New Mexico)
- Edwin C. Denby (from Michigan)
- Harry Ford Sinclair (from Illinois)
- Edward L. Doheny (from California)
- Charles R. Forbes (from Hawaii; born in Scotland)
- Thomas W. Miller (from Delaware)
