= Jess Smith =

American political aide (1872–1923)

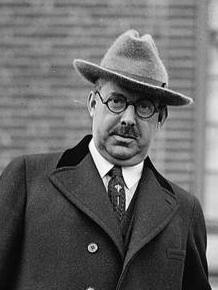
- Smith in 1920
- Born: Jesse Worley Smith; October 19, 1872; Washington Court House, Ohio, U.S.
- Died: May 30, 1923 (aged 50); Washington, D.C., U.S.
- Burial place: Washington Cemetery
- Occupation: Political aide
- Years active: 1920–1923
- Known for: Suspected bootlegging scandal
- Spouse: Roxy Stinson (m. 1908; div. 1910)

Jesse Worley Smith (October 10, 1872 – May 30, 1923) was an American political aide who was a member of the Ohio Gang, the circle of political and business associates around President Warren G. Harding. Smith was a close assistant of Attorney General Harry M. Daugherty, and was suspected of illegally selling government liquor before dying by suicide.

== Career ==
Jesse Worley Smith was born and raised in Washington Court House, Ohio, where he befriended future U.S. Attorney General Harry M. Daugherty. When Smith's father died, Daugherty became an elder brother figure to him, assisting him in opening a department store. Daugherty first enlisted Smith as his aide while acting as Warren G. Harding's campaign manager for the 1920 presidential election, and when Daugherty assumed the office of Attorney General in 1921, Smith accompanied him to Washington. Although never on the government payroll, Smith kept an office near his boss at the U.S. Department of Justice.

Smith was also Daugherty's roommate at the Wardman Park Hotel in Washington. Daugherty "lived, worked, and traveled in the near-constant company" of Smith. The two routinely spent days together in a cabin in the Ohio woods, and in the capital took up social roles usually reserved for spouses. Daugherty's wife had remained in Ohio due to illness, while Smith was on friendly terms with his ex-wife Roxy Stinson, whom he had married in 1908 and divorced 18 months later. Although rumors circulated that Daugherty and Smith were in a homosexual relationship, there is no evidence to corroborate this.

With Prohibition enacted as federal law, Smith was suspected of using his position to sell alcohol to bootleggers; chief among them was George Remus, who paid Smith for licenses to purchase government liquor—which Remus resold illegally at a profit—as well as immunity from prosecution from Daugherty. Smith was also linked to the "Little Green House on K Street" where multiple Harding administration scandals were said to have been formulated. The allegations of Smith's illegal activities brought embarrassment to Harding, whose administration was already under scrutiny while embroiled in the Teapot Dome scandal. This culminated in Harding telling Daugherty he wanted Smith out of Washington.

== Death and aftermath ==
Smith died of a gunshot wound at the Wardman Park Hotel in Washington on May 30, 1923. As he was found with a pistol at his side, his death was ruled a suicide. Smith, depressed and in failing health, feared that Daugherty "no longer needed or wanted him." Bureau of Investigation director William J. Burns also lived in the hotel and rushed to Smith's residence to "tidy up the scene" prior to the arrival of police. No autopsy was performed and Smith had destroyed all of his personal papers before his death.

On March 12, 1924, Smith's ex-wife Roxy Stinson informed a Senate committee that Smith would consistently return to Ohio to relay information regarding Daugherty's financial crimes. Alabama senator J. Thomas Heflin was not alone in suspecting foul play in Smith's death, saying in 1926: "Nobody else knew what he knew and with him dead there was nobody to tell the story—so Jesse Smith was murdered." On the Senate floor, Heflin suggested that Smith was tasked with selling liquor to repay a $5 million loan that Treasury Secretary Andrew Mellon had given to the Republican National Committee, but was murdered as a coverup when his illegal activities were exposed.

== In media ==
On the HBO television series Boardwalk Empire, Smith is played by actor Ed Jewett. On the show, Smith's death is dramatized as a suicide moments after thwarting an assassination attempt by Ohio Gang operative Gaston Means, who sought to prevent Smith from implicating Daugherty in his crimes.

== See also ==
- Scandals of the Warren G. Harding administration
