= Edwin Denby (politician) =

American lawyer and politician (1870–1929)

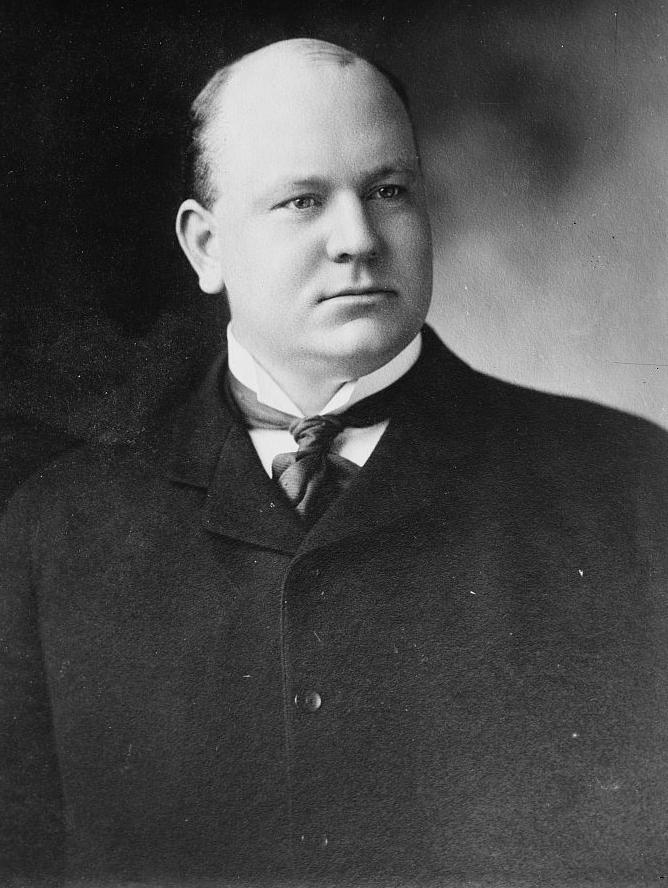

42nd United States Secretary of the Navy
- In office March 6, 1921 – March 10, 1924
- President: Warren G. Harding; Calvin Coolidge
- Preceded by: Josephus Daniels
- Succeeded by: Curtis D. Wilbur

Member of the U.S. House of Representatives from Michigan's 1st district
- In office March 4, 1905 – March 3, 1911
- Preceded by: Alfred Lucking
- Succeeded by: Frank Doremus

Member of the Michigan House of Representatives
- In office 1903

Personal details
- Born: February 18, 1870 Evansville, Indiana, U.S.
- Died: February 8, 1929 (aged 58) Detroit, Michigan, U.S.
- Party: Republican
- Spouse: Marion Bartlett Thurber (m. 1911)
- Children: 2
- Education: University of Michigan, Ann Arbor (LLB)

Military service
- Allegiance: United States
- Branch/service: United States Navy; United States Marine Corps
- Years of service: 1898 (USN); 1917–1919 (USMC)
- Rank: Gunner's Mate 3rd Class (USN); Major (USMC)
- Battles/wars: Spanish-American War; World War I

Edwin Denby (February 18, 1870 – February 8, 1929) was an American lawyer and politician who served as Secretary of the Navy in the administrations of Warren G. Harding and Calvin Coolidge from 1921 to 1924. He also played a notable role in the infamous Teapot Dome scandal which took place during the Harding presidency. He was the son of Charles Harvey Denby, grandson of Graham N. Fitch, brother of Charles Denby, Jr., and uncle of dance critic Edwin Orr Denby.

== Early life and education ==
Denby was born in Evansville, Indiana, where he attended the public schools. In 1885, his father, Charles Harvey Denby, was appointed United States minister at Peking, China, by President Grover Cleveland, and Edwin accompanied him. He worked in the maritime customs service from 1887 to 1894. He then returned to the United States and graduated from law school at the University of Michigan in 1896. While attending the University of Michigan, Denby played on the 1895 Michigan Wolverines football team. He was subsequently admitted to the bar and began practicing as a lawyer in Detroit.

In 1898 Denby enlisted in the United States Navy and served aboard the auxiliary cruiser USS Yosemite in the Caribbean. He was discharged with the rating of Gunner's Mate 3rd Class.

== Political and military career ==
He was a member of the Michigan House of Representatives in 1903. In 1904, Denby was elected as a Republican from Michigan's 1st congressional district to the 59th, 60th and 61st Congresses, serving from March 4, 1905, to March 3, 1911. Denby served as chairman of the United States House Committee on Naval Affairs.

He was defeated in 1910 general election by Democrat Frank E. Doremus and resumed his law practice in Detroit. He served as president of the Detroit Board of Commerce in 1916, and in 1917 enlisted as a private in the United States Marine Corps when the U.S. entered World War I. He was discharged in 1919 with the rank of major.

When Warren G. Harding became President in March 1921, he appointed Denby Secretary of the Navy. During the crisis of mail robberies in 1921, Denby issued orders that Marines should be put in mail trucks and rail cars as protectors of the U.S. Mails. In his stirring order "To the Men of the Mail Guard", Denby impressed upon his former service the importance of the high duty entrusted to them: "If two Marines are covered by a robber, neither must put up his hands, but both must immediately go for their guns. One may die, but the other will get the robber, and the mail will get through. When our Corps goes in as guards over the mail, that mail must be delivered, or there must be a Marine dead at the post of duty. There can be no compromise ..." Within days, the robberies stopped, and there was not a single delivery of the mails disrupted while Marines stood the watch.

=== Teapot Dome scandal ===
Shortly afterwards, Denby got Harding's approval to transfer control of the naval oil reserves at Teapot Dome, Wyoming, and Elk Hills, California, from the Department of the Navy to the Department of the Interior, headed by Albert B. Fall. Fall proceeded to lease these oil fields to friends who were heads of oil companies in exchange for over $400,000 in personal loans. Despite attempts to keep the deal secret, The Wall Street Journal leaked news of the leasing, and the Senate decided to launch an inquiry into the matter.

The investigation began in October 1923 after Harding's death, and the Senate Committee on Lands and Public Surveys, which carried out the inquiry, concluded in 1924 that the Teapot Dome and Elk Hills leases to the oil companies had been fraudulent and corrupt. Both Denby and Fall were forced to resign from office as a result; however, it is apparent that President Harding did not have an active role in the wrongdoing.

== Death and personal life ==
Denby married Marion Thurber of Detroit in 1911. They had two children, Edwin Jr. and Marion. Following his resignation, Denby went back to practicing law in Detroit, where he died at age 58.

Detroit's Edwin C. Denby High School is named in his honor, as is the Denby Center for Children and Family Services, which the Salvation Army opened in Detroit in 1930 to provide housing and treatment for abused and neglected children.

A portrait of Edwin Denby, painted by Robert Grafton, hangs in the Michigan State Capitol Building.

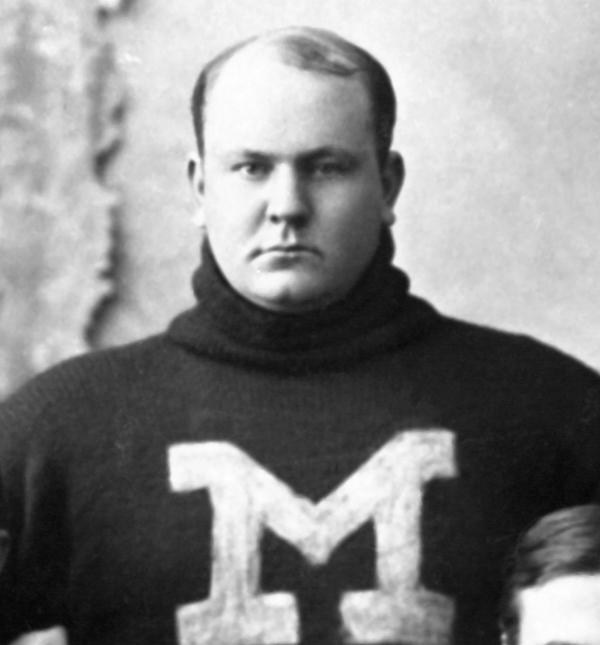
Denby as a Michigan Wolverines football player in 1896

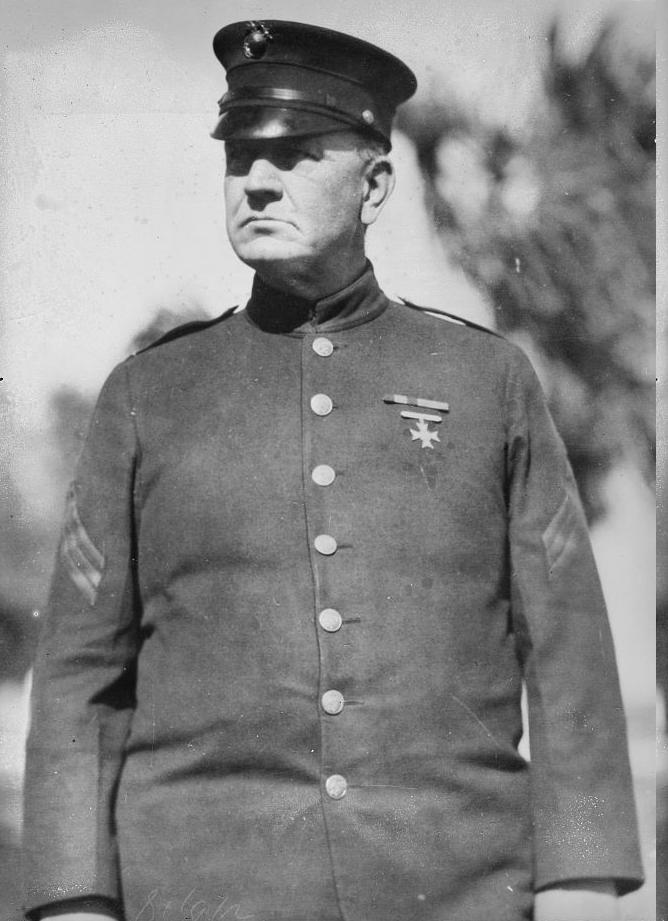
Sergeant Edwin Denby, USMC in 1918

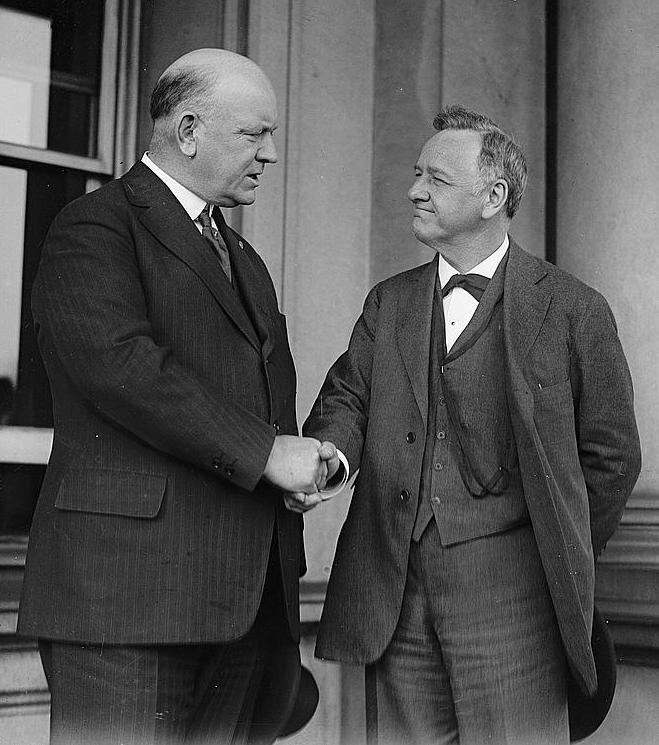
Denby shaking hands with his predecessor as Secretary of the Navy, Josephus Daniels

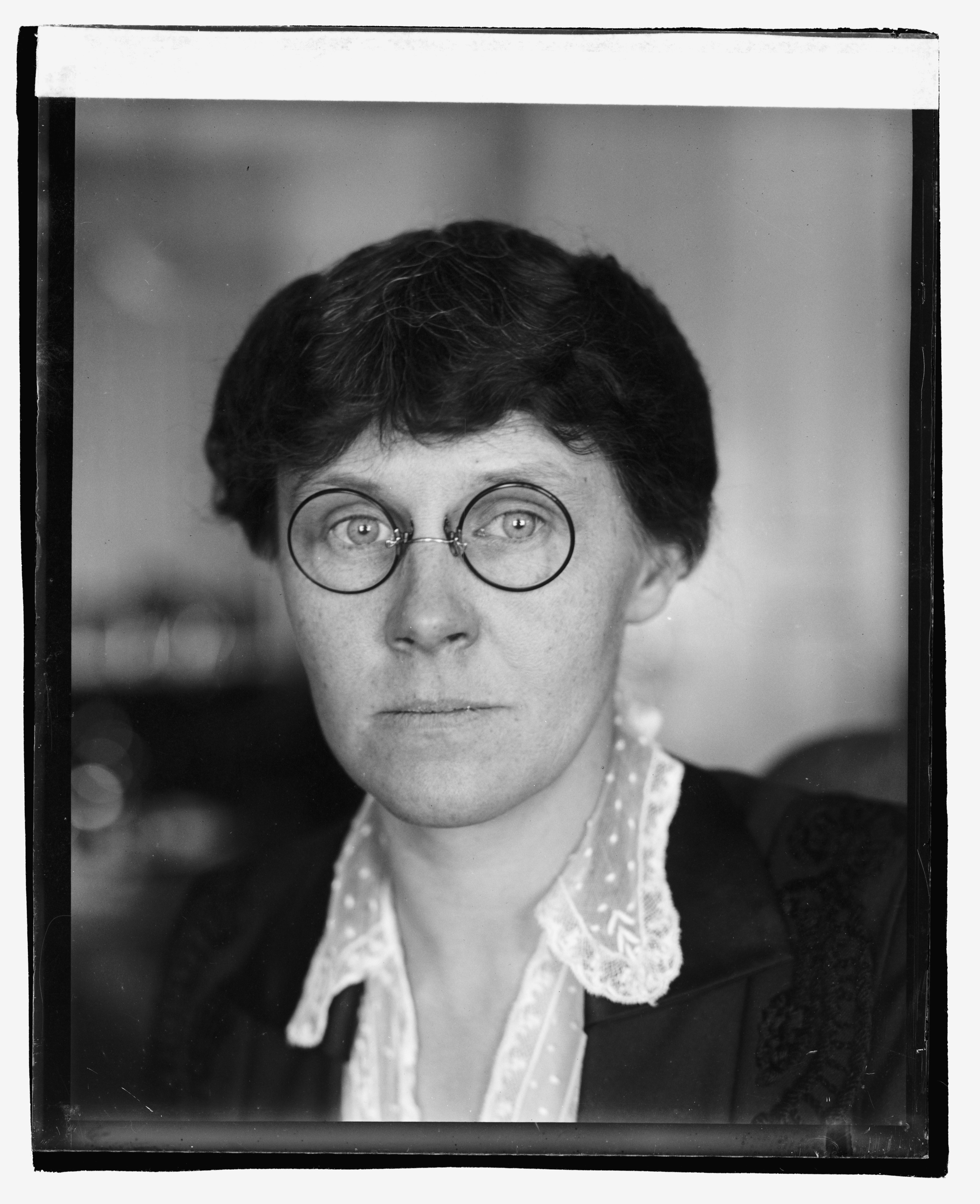
Mrs. Edwin Denby

== See also ==
- Little Green House on K Street

U.S. House of Representatives
Preceded by Alfred Lucking	Member of the U.S. House of Representatives from Michigan's 1st congressional district March 4, 1905 – March 3, 1911	Succeeded by Frank E. Doremus
Government offices
Preceded by Josephus Daniels	United States Secretary of the Navy; March 6, 1921 – March 10, 1924	Succeeded by Curtis D. Wilbur
