= Teapot Rock =

Rock formation in central Wyoming, United States

- U.S. National Register of Historic Places
- Teapot Rock in 2017

- Location within Wyoming Location within the United States
- Location: Natrona County, Wyoming, US
- Nearest city: Midwest, Wyoming
- Coordinates: 43°14′0″N 106°18′40″W
- Built: 1922
- NRHP reference No.: 74002028
- Added to NRHP: December 30, 1974

Teapot Rock, also Teapot Dome, is a distinctive sedimentary rock formation and nearby oil field in Natrona County, Wyoming, that became the focus of the Teapot Dome bribery scandal during the administration of President Warren G. Harding. The site was listed on the National Register of Historic Places in 1974.

== Description ==
The eroded sandstone formation stands about 75 feet (25 m) tall and is about 300 feet (90 m) in circumference. It is located a few hundred yards east of Wyoming Highway 259, about 19 miles (30 km) north of Casper, Wyoming, in the Powder River Basin near Teapot Creek, a tributary of Salt Creek.

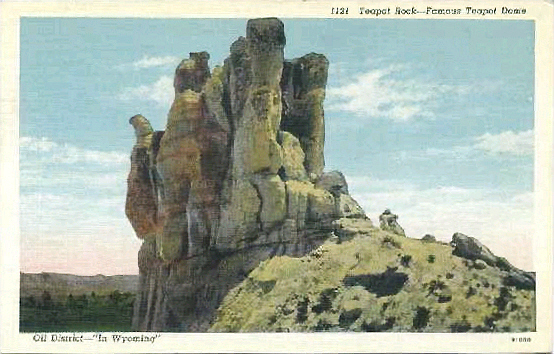
Teapot Rock on an old postcard from around 1922

The outline of the rock once resembled a teapot and gave its name to several man-made and natural features, including a geologic structural uplift known as the Teapot Dome, and an oil field about 6 miles (10 km) east. Over time, the features that gave the formation its name have been eroded by windstorms; the "handle" disappeared in 1930 and the "spout" in 1962.

== History ==
In 1915, the Teapot Dome Oil Field was designated Naval Petroleum Reserve Number Three as part of a program to ensure that the U.S. Navy, which was converting to oil-fired boilers, would have sufficient fuel reserves in an emergency. It was one of several fields in the area, the largest of which was the Salt Creek Oil Field. By comparison to the Salt Creek Field peak production of 35,301,608 barrels (5,612,507.2 m^{3}) in 1923, the Teapot Dome field had about 64 wells, with a few producing more than 150 barrels per day (24 m^{3}/d).

The Teapot Dome oil field was idle for 49 years following the scandal, but went back into production in 1976. After Teapot Dome had earned over $569 million in revenue from the 22 million barrels (3,500,000 m^{3}) of oil extracted over the previous 39 years, the Department of Energy sold the oil field in February 2015 for $45 million to New York–based privately-owned Stranded Oil Resources Corp.

== See also ==
- List of individual rocks
