= Farrington v. Tokushige =

- Supreme Court of the United States

Argued January 21, 1927 Decided February, 1927
- Full case name: Farrington, Governor, et al. v. T. Tokushige et al.
- Citations: 273 U.S. 284 (more) 47 S. Ct. 406; 71 L. Ed. 646; 1927 U.S. LEXIS 699

Case history
- Prior: Injunction granted, United States District Court for the District of Hawaii; affirmed, 11 F.2d 710 (9th Cir. 1926); cert. granted, 273 U.S. 677 (1926).

Holding
- The Territory of Hawaii's law, making it illegal for schools to teach foreign languages without a permit, violates the Due Process Clauses of the Fifth Amendment and Fourteenth Amendment.

Court membership
- Chief Justice William H. Taft Associate Justices Oliver W. Holmes Jr. · Willis Van Devanter; James C. McReynolds · Louis Brandeis; George Sutherland · Pierce Butler; Edward T. Sanford · Harlan F. Stone

Case opinion
- Majority: McReynolds, joined by unanimous

Laws applied
- Amendment V and Amendment XIV, Act 30, Special Session 1920, legislature of Hawaii

Farrington v. Tokushige, 273 U.S. 284 (1927), was a case in which the Supreme Court of the United States unanimously struck down the Territory of Hawaii's law, making it illegal for schools to teach foreign languages without a permit, as it violated the Due Process Clause of the Fifth Amendment. Violation of the due process clause under the Fourteenth Amendment was not considered as Hawaii was a territory of the United States at the time.

== Decision ==
The Court unanimously affirmed the lower court's decision:

"The foregoing statement is enough to show that the school Act and the measures adopted thereunder go far beyond mere regulation of privately supported schools where children obtain instruction deemed valuable by their parents and which is not obviously in conflict with any public interest. They give affirmative direction concerning the intimate and essential details of such schools, intrust their control to public officers, and deny both owners and patrons reasonable choice and discretion in respect of teachers, curriculum and text-books. Enforcement of the Act probably would destroy most, if not all, of them; and, certainly, it would deprive parents of fair opportunity to procure for their children instruction which they think important and we cannot say is harmful. The Japanese parent has the right to direct the education of his own child without unreasonable restrictions; the Constitution protects him as well as those who speak another tongue."

The Court stated that "owners, parents and children" are guaranteed rights by the Due Process Clause of the Fifth Amendment with reference to Meyer v. Nebraska, Bartels v. Iowa, and Pierce v. Society of Sisters.

== See also ==
- List of United States Supreme Court cases, volume 273
- Meyer v. Nebraska
- Pierce v. Society of Sisters
