= McGrain v. Daugherty =

- Supreme Court of the United States

Argued December 5, 1924 Decided January 17, 1927
- Full case name: McGrain v. Daugherty
- Citations: 273 U.S. 135 (more) 47 S. Ct. 319; 71 L. Ed. 580; 1927 U.S. LEXIS 985

Holding
- The Constitution grants Congress auxiliary powers to carry out its duties. As congressional investigations have a legislative purpose, Congress has the power to make inquiries and to compel information when it is necessary and proper to execute Congress' authority under the Constitution.

Court membership
- Chief Justice William H. Taft Associate Justices Oliver W. Holmes Jr. · Willis Van Devanter; James C. McReynolds · Louis Brandeis; George Sutherland · Pierce Butler; Edward T. Sanford · Harlan F. Stone

Case opinion
- Majority: Van Devanter, joined by Taft, Holmes, McReynolds, Brandeis, Sutherland, Butler, Sanford
- Stone took no part in the consideration or decision of the case.

Laws applied
- U.S. Const. art. I

McGrain v. Daugherty, 273 U.S. 135 (1927), was a case heard before the Supreme Court, decided on January 17, 1927. It was a challenge to Mally Daugherty's contempt conviction and arrest, which happened when he failed to appear before a Senate committee investigating the failure of his brother, Attorney General Harry Daugherty, to investigate the perpetrators of the Teapot Dome Scandal. The court upheld his conviction.

In the case, the Supreme Court held for the first time that under the Constitution, Congress has the power to compel witnesses to appear and provide testimony.

== Background ==
Investigations in 1922 about the Teapot Dome scandal began in the Department of the Interior, but when questions regarding the Justice Department were raised, Congress took control and led further investigation. Suspicions that Attorney General Harry M. Daugherty was involved in the scandal began to arise because of his reluctance to pursue the investigation. Harry Daugherty's brother, Mally S. Daugherty, was president of the Midland National Bank of Washington Court House, Ohio, an institution suspected of involvement in the scandal. He was issued subpoenas by a Senate committee commanding him to appear before the committee to testify and to produce documents related to the investigation. Thomas W. Miller, the Alien Property Custodian, implicated Harry Daugherty and others in the Harding Administration for pressuring him to deposit funds in the Midland Bank. When Harry Daugherty resigned it increased suspicions and Mally was arrested for contempt because he refused to appear before the Senate committee. Mally then challenged the committee's authority to act and arrest a civilian in order to acquire evidence.

== Issues in the case ==
According to the court, the issues in the case were, "(a) whether the Senate—or the House of Representatives, both being on the same plane in this regard—has power, through its own process, to compel a private individual to appear before it or one of its committees and give testimony needed to enable it efficiently to exercise a legislative function belonging to it under the Constitution; and (b) whether it sufficiently appears that the process was being employed in this instance to obtain testimony for that purpose."

Mally Daugherty's filing challenged Congress' power to compel evidence by subpoena and it also included a technical challenge in the form of the subpoena, claiming that the arrest warrant should not have been issued to the sergeant at arms and that a deputy of the sergeant at arms did not have authority to execute the warrant. Mally also claimed that an interlocutory injunction granted by a state court at Washington Court House prohibited the execution of the warrant.

== Court's opinion ==
The court dismissed the technical claims, citing a standing Senate rule that authorizes the sergeant at arms to use deputies. The claim about interlocutory injunction granted by the state court was dismissed because the injunction didn't specifically enjoin the directives in the warrant.

With regard to the Constitutional requirement that warrants be issued under oath or affirmation, the court said that the warrants were self-affirming because, "In legislative practice, committee reports are regarded as made under the sanction of the oath of office of its members, and where the matters reported are within the committee's knowledge and constitute probable cause for an attachment, such reports are acted on and given effect, without requiring that they be supported by further oath or affirmation."

The court addressed the core issue in the case, whether Congress has the authority to investigate and compel testimony and other evidence, by citing previous investigations authorized by the House and Senate. "This power was both asserted and exerted by the House of Representatives in 1792, when it appointed a select committee to inquire into the St. Clair expedition and authorized the committee to send for necessary persons, papers and records. Mr. Madison, who had taken an important part in framing the Constitution only five years before, and four of his associates in that work, were members of the House of Representatives at the time, and all voted for the inquiry." Another later investigation by the Senate and other various cases were also discussed in the opinion.

The court also said that Congress' investigative power is just another subordinate duty to its legislative duties: "The means of carrying into effect by law all the granted powers, is given where legislation is applicable and necessary; but there are subordinate matters, not amounting to laws; there are inquiries of the one house or the other house, which each house has a right to conduct; which each has, from the beginning, exercised the power to conduct; and each has, from the beginning, summoned witnesses. This has been the practice of the government from the beginning; and if we have a right to summon the witness, all the rest follows as a matter of course."

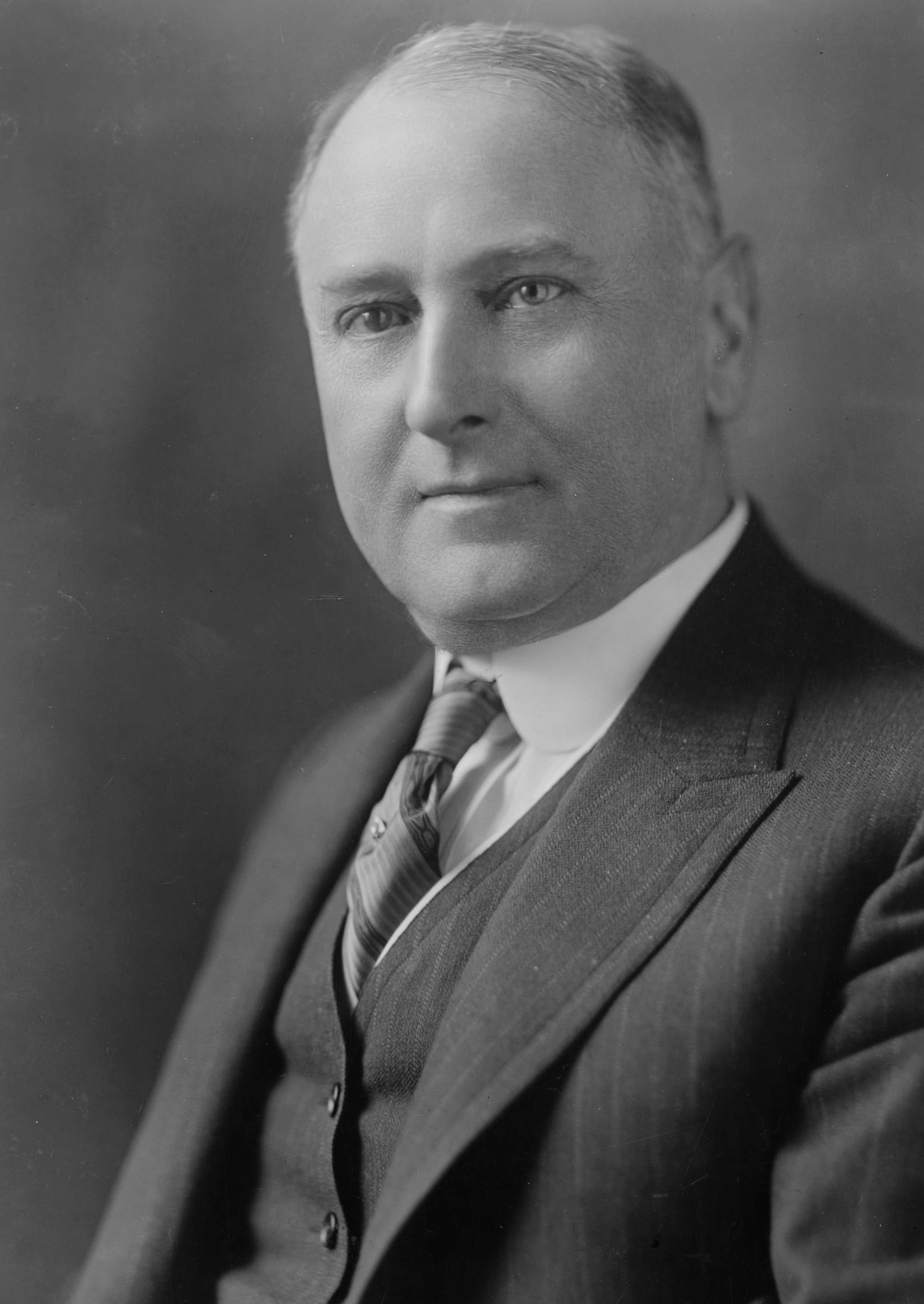
Harry Daugherty

According to the court, Congress possesses, not only the powers that are expressly granted to them by the Constitution, but "auxiliary powers" that are necessary and appropriate to make the express powers effective. In the opinion, they limited the scope of those powers indicating that Congress doesn't have "general" power to inquire into private affairs and compel disclosures, but only with "such limited power of inquiry as is shown to exist when the rule of constitutional interpretation just stated is rightly applied."

Applying that interpretation of the law to this specific case, the court found that the testimony and other evidence compelled by Congress was in aid of the legislative function and therefore a valid exercise of congressional power. This specific finding overturned the finding of the lower court which had determined that compelling such evidence was not in furtherance of Congress' legislative powers. The lower court had contended that Congress was exercising a judicial function by compelling the evidence, which that lower court said was outside of Congress' purview. The Supreme Court disagreed with the lower court.

Another issue before the court was whether the question was moot because the session of Congress had expired. According to Professor Joshua Kastenberg at the University of New Mexico School of Law, Justice Brandeis had initially wanted to dispose of the appeal on the basis of mootness but after hearing out the other justices, he determined this doctrine did not apply and the court ruled that the case was not moot. On the other hand, Chief Justice William Howard Taft likely should not have sat on the case at all. Harry Daugherty had been his campaign manager in Ohio in 1908 and the two corresponded regularly. Additionally, in an act of unprecedented judicial involvement, Taft earlier advised President Calvin Coolidge on the appointment of presidential investigators, Owen Roberts and Atlee Pomerene into the oil leasing aspects of the scandal. And finally, during the lengthy time from the issuance of the Senate subpoena, through the district court's denial of Senate authority, and to the court, Taft corresponded with his sons and leading Republicans on how to mitigate any fallout in the 1924 and 1926 elections.

== Lawyers ==
The lawyers in McGrain v. Daugherty were:

- For McGrain (the petitioner): George T. Washington, the Solicitor of the Department of State, and Charles B. Rugg, the Assistant Attorney General.
- For Daugherty (the respondent): John W. Davis, a former Solicitor General and Democratic presidential nominee, and James M. Beck, a former Solicitor General and Republican congressman.
