= Tyson & Brother v. Banton =

- Supreme Court of the United States

Argued October 6–7, 1926 Decided February 28, 1927
- Full case name: Tyson & Brother v. Banton
- Citations: 273 U.S. 418 (more) 47 S. Ct. 426; 71 L. Ed. 718; 1927 U.S. LEXIS 707

Court membership
- Chief Justice William H. Taft Associate Justices Oliver W. Holmes Jr. · Willis Van Devanter; James C. McReynolds · Louis Brandeis; George Sutherland · Pierce Butler; Edward T. Sanford · Harlan F. Stone

Case opinions
- Majority: Sutherland, joined by Taft, Van Devanter, McReynolds, Butler
- Dissent: Holmes, joined by Brandeis
- Dissent: Stone, joined by Holmes, Brandeis
- Dissent: Sanford

Laws applied
- U.S. Const. amend. XIV

Tyson & Brother v. Banton, 273 U.S. 418 (1927), is a US Supreme Court case, concerning the constitutionality of the State of New York imposing restrictions on the price of resold theatre tickets. It has been reversed but is notable for the dissent of Oliver Wendell Holmes.

== Background ==
A New York state statute limited the resale price of theatre tickets to fifty cents over the initial box office price.

== Opinion of the Court ==
The majority declared the statute was unconstitutional on grounds of the Fourteenth Amendment, but Oliver Wendell Holmes, Louis Brandeis, Harlan F. Stone, and Edward T. Sanford dissented.

== See also ==
- List of United States Supreme Court cases, volume 273
