= Tumey v. Ohio =

- Supreme Court of the United States

Argued November 29–30, 1926 Decided March 7, 1927
- Full case name: Tumey v. State of Ohio
- Citations: 273 U.S. 510 (more) 47 S. Ct. 437; 71 L. Ed. 749; 1927 U.S. LEXIS 708

Case history
- Prior: Petition in error dismissed, Tumey v. State, 115 Ohio St. 701, 155 N.E. 698 (1926).

Court membership
- Chief Justice William H. Taft Associate Justices Oliver W. Holmes Jr. · Willis Van Devanter; James C. McReynolds · Louis Brandeis; George Sutherland · Pierce Butler; Edward T. Sanford · Harlan F. Stone

Case opinion
- Majority: Taft, joined by a unanimous court

Laws applied
- U.S. Const. amend. XIV

Tumey v. Ohio, 273 U.S. 510 (1927), is a US Supreme Court case, concerning the due process of judicial disqualification. The court struck down an Ohio law that financially rewarded public officials for successfully prosecuting cases related to Prohibition. The court's decision in this case continues to provide precedent today in many cases involving judicial impartiality.

== Background ==
The mayor of the village of North College Hill, Ohio received $12 for every defendant convicted before him. Ed Tumey was convicted before the mayor of unlawfully possessing intoxicating liquor.

== Opinion of the Court ==
The court held that Tumey's conviction violated the Fourteenth Amendment, reasoning that it "deprives a defendant in a criminal case of due process of law to subject his liberty or property to the judgment of a court, the judge of which has a direct, personal, substantial pecuniary interest in reaching a conclusion against him in his case."

== See also ==
- List of United States Supreme Court cases, volume 273
- Caperton v. A.T. Massey Coal Co.
