= Harry M. Daugherty =

American politician (1860–1941)

Harry Daugherty
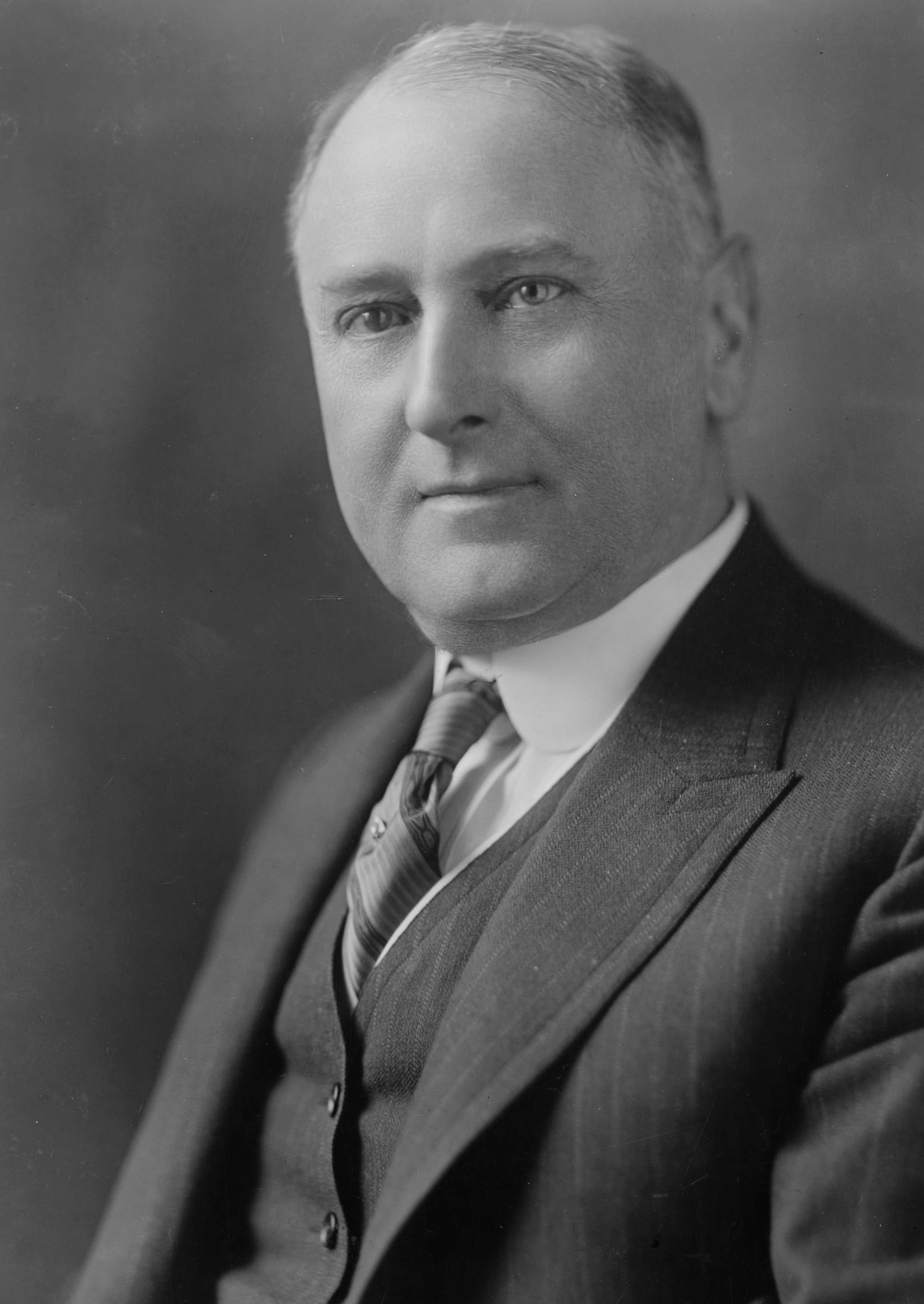
- Daugherty in 1920

51st United States Attorney General
- In office March 4, 1921 – April 6, 1924
- President: Warren G. Harding; Calvin Coolidge
- Preceded by: Mitchell Palmer
- Succeeded by: Harlan F. Stone

Member of the Ohio House of Representatives
- In office 1890–1894
- Preceded by: David Worthington

Personal details
- Born: January 26, 1860 Washington Court House, Ohio, U.S.
- Died: October 12, 1941 (aged 81) Columbus, Ohio, U.S.
- Party: Republican
- Spouse: Lucie Walker
- Education: University of Michigan (LLB)

Harry Micajah Daugherty (/ˈdoʊ.ərti/; January 26, 1860 – October 12, 1941) was an American politician. A key Republican political insider from Ohio, he is best remembered for his service as Attorney General of the United States under presidents Warren G. Harding and Calvin Coolidge, as well as for his involvement in the Teapot Dome scandal during Harding's presidency.

Despite his status as a key political leader of the Ohio Republican Party from the 1880s to the first decade of the 20th century, Daugherty was only briefly a statewide elected politician by serving just two terms in the Ohio General Assembly, working closely during the last two years with state governor William McKinley. Although he sought national office several times, Daugherty was unable to secure his party’s nomination, and was never elected to office again.

Daugherty remained an influential figure behind the election of several U.S. representatives and senators. He was Harding's campaign manager at the 1920 Republican National Convention. Following Harding's successful election, Daugherty was named attorney general. In that capacity, he was instrumental in winning presidential pardons for jailed anti-war dissidents such as Eugene V. Debs. Twice the subject of federal corruption investigations, Daugherty was forced in 1924 to resign his post as attorney general by Coolidge.

== Biography ==
=== Early years ===
Harry M. Daugherty was born on January 26, 1860, in the small town of Washington Court House, Ohio. Daugherty's father, John H. Daugherty, was the Pennsylvania-born son of Irish immigrants and worked as a farmer and tailor. His mother, Jane Draper Daugherty, was from a prominent Ohio family with Virginia roots dating back to the time of the American Revolution. Daugherty was a first cousin of actress Majel Coleman.

Daugherty's father died of diphtheria when Harry was just four years old, as did one of his brothers, leaving his mother as the sole provider for the household. Harry and his older brother, Mally, were forced by economic necessity to take a variety of jobs from a relatively early age to help with the family's living expenses. Daugherty's mother later recalled that he was so young when he worked in a local grocery store that he had to stand on a wooden crate to reach the cash register.

Daugherty's mother wanted him to become a Methodist minister, but the prospect of life as a clergyman held no appeal for him. Instead, after graduating from high school in Washington Court House, Daugherty studied medicine for a year before taking a position as a cub reporter for The Cincinnati Enquirer.

In 1878 Daugherty entered the University of Michigan Law School, accepted there despite not having first obtained an undergraduate education. He supplemented his insufficient income by gambling, winning a significant sum betting on the election of James Garfield in the 1880 presidential election. Sports betting was also an area of some interest to Daugherty and his brother, who went so far as to tap telegraph wires so that they could obtain game information in advance. Initially successful, this ethically shady activity was ultimately discovered and exposed by local gamblers puzzled by the brothers' uncanny success.

Daugherty graduated from law school in 1881 and returned home to Ohio, where he accepted a job in the office of a Washington Court House attorney, spending his spare time preparing to take the Ohio state bar examination.

=== Factional soldier ===
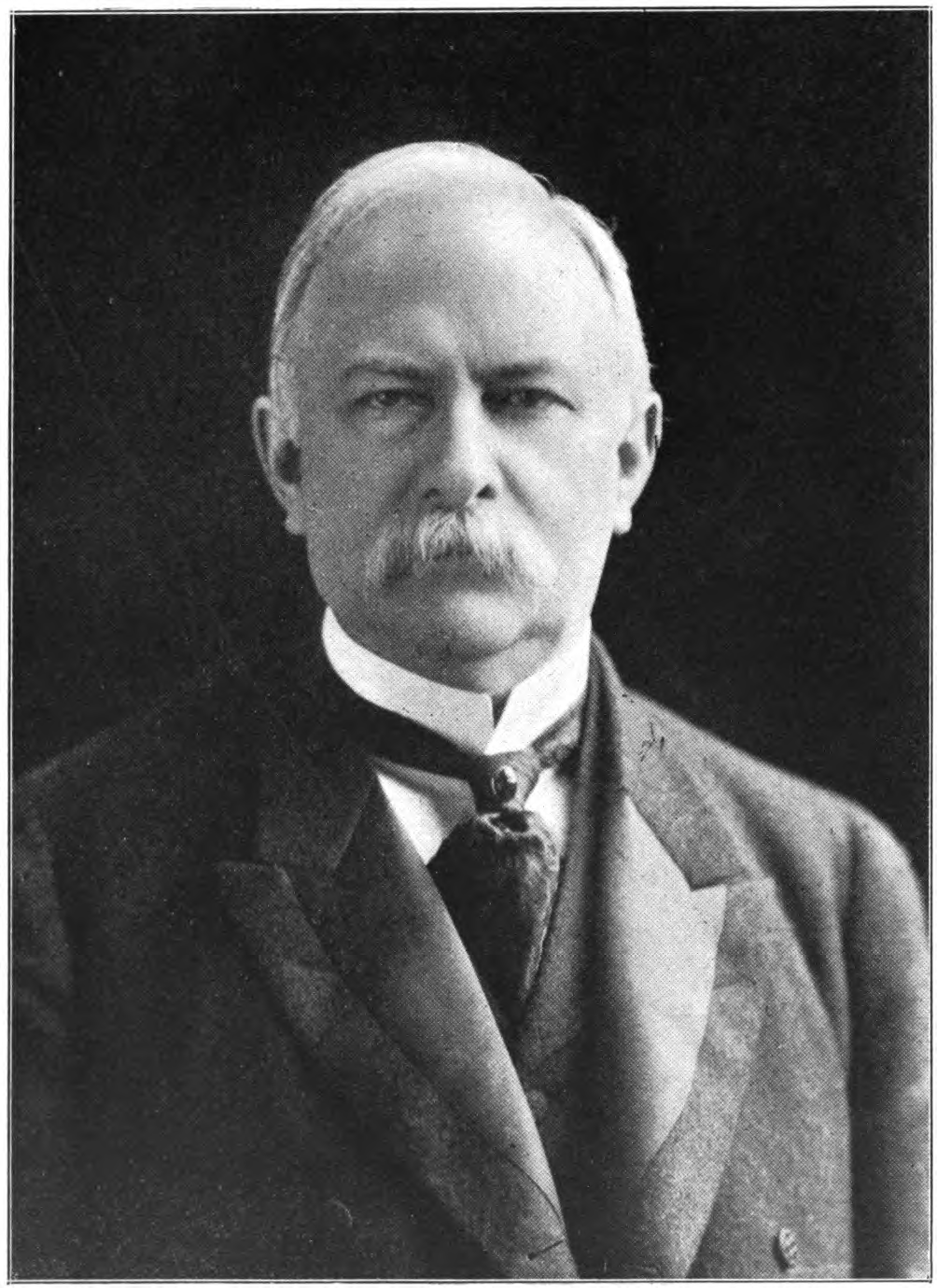
Ohio governor Joseph B. Foraker, with whom Daugherty was politically allied as a young man, as he appeared in 1902

In 1882 Daugherty was elected by the Fayette County Republican Central Committee as the recording secretary of the organization. He ran for political office in the election of 1882, winning election as the clerk of nearby Union Township. Daugherty served a single two-year term, earning a salary of $1500 per year.

The following year Daugherty was elected secretary of the Fayette County Executive Committee, where he earned a reputation as an intense and astute young political activist. He was selected as one of five delegates from the Fayette Country Republican Party to the Ohio State Republican Convention in 1883, held in Columbus. There Daugherty helped select an aggressive young Cincinnati judge named Joseph B. Foraker as the party's 1883 gubernatorial nominee.

A close political relationship developed between Foraker and Daugherty, with Daugherty exerting himself in support of Foraker's unsuccessful 1883 campaign. When Foraker was elected as Governor of Ohio in 1885, he was able to return the favor, boosting his protégé Daugherty's career. The connection between the two was tightened further in September 1884, when Daugherty married Lucille Walker of Wellston, Ohio – a cousin of Foraker's wife.

Daugherty was elected to a two-year term on the city council in the election of 1885, serving from 1886 to 1887. He was elected as chairman of the Fayette County Republican Central Committee in 1886 but spent most of his time helping to establish a law practice. After practicing alone for three years, Daugherty formed a partnership with Horatio B. Maynard, a prominent local lawyer, and the new practice soon emerged as a leading law firm in the county.

In 1889 Republican David Worthington decided not to seek reelection to the Ohio General Assembly and Daugherty threw his hat into the ring. After eking out a narrow victory in the Republican primary election, Daugherty emerged victorious in November, winning election to the Ohio House of Representatives by slightly more than 800 votes out of 5,100 ballots cast. Although Daugherty won his race, his close political ally Joseph Foraker lost his bid for a third term as Governor and the Democratic Party won control of the Assembly as well, forcing Daugherty to participate as a member of the minority party.

Daugherty won reelection to the Ohio House of Representatives in the fall of 1891, beating his Democratic opponent by more than 750 votes out of about 4,900 cast. This time Ohio Republicans recaptured not only the Governor's mansion – electing William McKinley to the state's chief executive office – but also the majority of the state assembly. Since in this era United States Senators were elected by state legislatures rather than by direct vote of the people, this meant that a Republican would be sent to Washington, DC to fill the expiring term of Senator John Sherman when the assembly reconvened in January 1892.

=== Change of alliances ===
Mark Hanna, a key leader of the Sherman faction of the Ohio Republican Party, as he appeared in 1896

The Ohio Republican Party had for several years been deeply split along factional lines, with Senator Sherman and former Governor Foraker leading rival groups of party activists and political functionaries. Foraker was determined to challenge Sherman for his Senate seat and sought assurances from Daugherty that he would continue to support him when the matter came before the legislature.

This placed Daugherty in a difficult position, since his native Fayette County was solidly behind the Sherman faction, which included Governor McKinley and the significant financial clout of Cleveland businessman Mark Hanna. Forced by the logic of the situation to switch alliances rather than risk being cast into political oblivion, Daugherty abandoned Foraker in the final contest of the Ohio Republican caucus on January 2, 1892, joining 52 others in voting for Sherman, against 38 for the insurgent campaign of Foraker.

In the aftermath of the caucus that would determine Ohio's U.S. Senator, editorials of the Democratic Columbus Post charged that Daugherty and fourteen other Ohio legislators had changed their support from Foraker to Sherman based upon "intimidation, threats, promises, and actual purchase" and accused Daugherty by name of having accepted cash payments. A formal investigation of this charge by a bi-partisan four member committee of the Ohio State Senate followed, with Daugherty being unanimously cleared of all charges in a report issued in April 1892.

The 1892 Senatorial campaign marked the formal attachment of Daugherty to the dominant Sherman-Hanna faction of the Ohio Republican Party after the better part of a decade as a trusted adherent of the rival Foraker faction. The move broadened Daugherty's political possibilities, and he was made chairman of the powerful Corporations Committee and named a member of the Judiciary Committee. In 1893 Daugherty was chosen as chairman of the Ohio Republican State Convention which nominated McKinley as the party's candidate for Governor.

Governor McKinley also named Daugherty as his floor leader in the House of Representatives, keeping party members in line behind the governor's legislative agenda. Over the next two years McKinley and Daugherty forged a close political friendship, working together closely and frequently sharing meals at breakfast and in the evening. With the Foraker faction, however, Daugherty became persona non grata due to what was perceived as his duplicitous political disloyalty.

Daugherty attempted to gain nomination as a Republican candidate for Congress in 1892, but the 7th District Republican Convention which put forward the party's nominee was irreconcilably split between Daugherty and his former law partner, A.R. Creamer, and wound up backing a dark horse candidate as a compromise, George W. Wilson. Wilson won his race in the November 1892 general election and wound up serving four years in Congress on behalf of the 7th District.

In the aftermath of his failure to win a seat in Congress, Sherman offered Daugherty a political appointment as Assistant District Attorney in Columbus. Daugherty ultimately decided to decline this position, instead opening a new law office in that city, while still remaining a resident and practicing attorney in his hometown of Washington Court House.

=== The Washington Court House riot ===
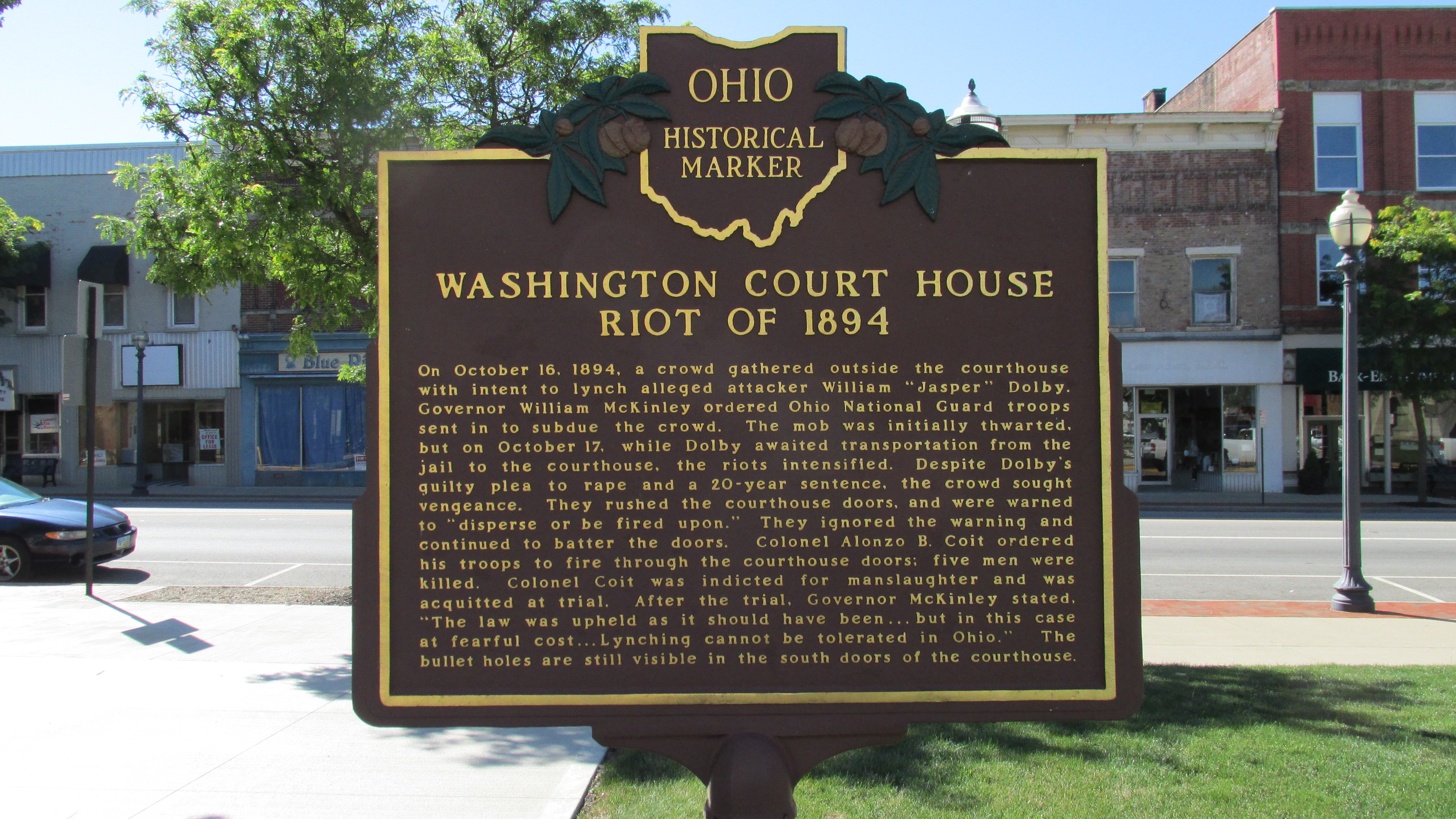
Ohio Historical Marker at the Fayette County Courthouse in Washington Court House, Ohio

On October 9, 1894, a black man named William Dolby was accused of assaulting a white woman named Mary C. Boyd in her home at Parrett's Station, a small settlement near Washington Court House. Dolby fled but was soon arrested and taken back to the jail at Washington Court House, where signs quickly pointed to an outburst of mob violence. Dolby supposedly confessed to the crime "upon being apprehended". The Fayette County sheriff called upon Governor McKinley to send out the militia to defend the prisoner from a prospective lynch mob following his sentencing to twenty years in prison at a hearing held on October 16.

On October 17 two companies of militiamen arrived at Washington Court House to guard Dolby for his coming transport to the Ohio Penitentiary at Columbus. That evening a mob gathered and began a siege of the jail, attempting to batter down the jailhouse doors so that the prisoner could be removed and violently killed. Commander of the National Guard forces, Colonel Alonzo Coit, ordered his troops to fire upon the enraged lynch mob, which they did, killing five rioters and wounding fifteen others. The mob still failed to disperse and fears grew that an armed assault would be launched by furious local citizens on the militiamen defending the jail. Around 2 am a second volley was fired by the defenders, this time over the heads of the rioters, with the gunfire finally having its desired effect of breaking up the unlawful gathering.

In the aftermath, Governor McKinley appointed a special court of inquiry to investigate the riot and militia shooting. Following an investigation, the court of inquiry returned an indictment against Col. Coit, charging him with manslaughter in the incident. McKinley then called upon Daugherty to shoulder the politically unpopular job of defending Coit at trial, in the face of a wrathful Fayette County citizenry which sought his conviction. Daugherty accepted the Coit case, and on March 5, 1895, won his acquittal of manslaughter charges.

=== From politician to political operator ===
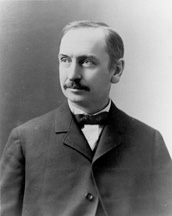
Theodore E. Burton, a congressman and senator, was a key Daugherty ally during the first decade of the 20th century.

Although Daugherty sought nomination by the Ohio Republican Party for Governor in 1895, Hanna decided to support another candidate instead, so Daugherty decided to launch a run for Ohio Attorney General instead. The Ohio Republican Convention was dominated by the Foraker faction, however, and Foraker loyalist Frank S. Monnett was nominated for the Attorney General post over the deeply distrusted Daugherty.

Not daunted by his loss, in 1896 Daugherty announced his desire to win election to Congress. An advisory primary election was held among Fayette County Republicans in March 1896, in which Daugherty narrowly won a bitterly fought race. The actual nomination was to be made by the 7th District Republican Convention, however, and there Daugherty fell victim to factional machinations, with the nomination going instead to Walter L. Weaver, who would ultimately serve two terms in Congress. For a second time Daugherty had been denied.

The Republican National Committee recognized Daugherty's gifts as an indefatigable partisan and effective stump speaker, however, and sent him out on the road in support of McKinley's campaign for President of the United States in 1896. Daugherty traveled through Nebraska, North Dakota, South Dakota, Minnesota, and Ohio, logging over 9,000 miles traveled in delivering some 47 campaign speeches in support of McKinley and the Republicans' successful effort.

In 1898 conflict emerged between Daugherty and Hanna over the slow payment of thousands of dollars of legal fees incurred by then-U.S. Senator Hanna in defending himself against a Senate investigation of electoral bribery charges. While Daugherty's insistence upon being paid had made for a tense relationship, the actual parting of their ways came in 1899, when Daugherty again sought the Republican nomination for Governor of Ohio. Neither Foraker nor Hanna supported Daugherty for the position, with Hanna lending his support to George K. Nash and Foraker clearly still seething over Daugherty's 1892 abandonment. Daugherty took his fight all the way to the Ohio Republican Convention before losing to Nash, 461 delegate votes to 205.

Over the next five years Daugherty skillfully built political influence in the Ohio Republican establishment by dealing with leaders of both of the party's major factions. Daugherty maintained considerable influence with Republicans in the state legislature, who had known and worked with Daugherty for years. His political rehabilitation was only partial, however, for as long as Foraker and Hanna remained the top factional leaders of Ohio Republican politics there remained a very real ceiling beyond which Daugherty could never hope to rise.

Hanna's death in February 1904 and a subsequent discrediting of some of his top allies such as George B. Cox on grounds of political bossism again cleared the way for Daugherty's emergence. By 1906 Daugherty stood as a leader of a new insurgent political faction which included Congressman Theodore E. Burton of Cleveland and former Governor Myron T. Herrick. Daugherty and Burton aligned themselves with supporters of William Howard Taft, Secretary of War under progressive Republican President Theodore Roosevelt, and together the factional allies forced Foraker out of the United States Senate and into political retirement, aided by muckraking news reports that Foraker had received nearly $30,000 as a political retainer from the Standard Oil Trust.

Daugherty was instrumental in helping his ally Burton win election to the Senate in 1908 but was once again relegated to a key backstage role instead of himself standing for election to high office. Daugherty's position as a political boss rather than a public politician had once again been confirmed.

During the party split of 1912, Daugherty was a staunch supporter of Taft and old guard Republican conservatism against the progressive Republicanism espoused by Roosevelt. Daugherty was a key figure on the ground in Ohio in behalf of the Taft campaign, issuing a major address on May 18 which was so well regarded that it was reproduced as a pamphlet by the Taft organization. Although Daugherty's machinations along with Cuyahoga County boss Maurice Maschke carried the state Republican convention for Taft, a split of the Republican field in the November election propelled Democrat Woodrow Wilson to the presidency with a plurality of under 42% of the vote.

=== The Harding campaign ===
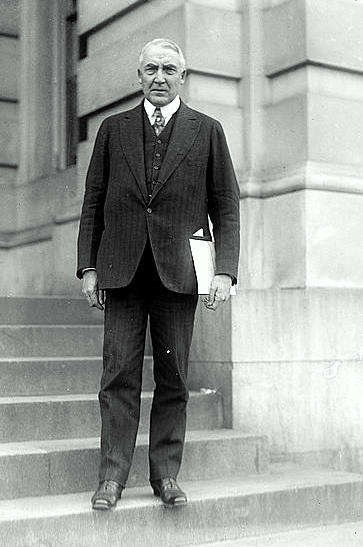
U.S. senator Warren Harding, c. 1918

The establishment of primary elections for the U.S. Senate in 1914 greatly reduced the power of political bosses such as Daugherty. He remained fully engaged as a political operative in spite of this major change, however, attaching himself to a powerful state senator named Warren G. Harding. Daugherty had known Harding since the autumn of 1899, when he had been prominent in Ohio politics and Harding was a 35-year-old upstart. A few years later, their roles were reversed when Harding was elected to the state senate in 1901 and appointed Republican floor leader in that same session. Harding was an eloquent speaker and a skilled negotiator of political compromise and emerged as one of the top leaders of the Foraker faction.

During the 1912 party split, Daugherty and Harding forged a political friendship working on behalf of the Taft campaign, with Daugherty filling the role of Ohio Republican Party chairman with Harding's newspaper, the Marion Daily Star, giving Daugherty its full support. Both were politically ambitious and while they enjoyed one another's company, they were not intimate personal friends. Harding managed to win election to the Senate in 1914. Daugherty ran for the Republican Senate nomination in 1916, campaigning against former Senator Charles W.F. Dick and former Governor Herrick. Herrick won the nomination, and lost the general election to Atlee Pomerene.

Continuing his political manipulation, in January 1918 Daugherty observed the significance of the growing temperance movement and opportunistically attempted to become a movement leader in the state. Daugherty was himself a drinker but was not a man to let personal habits stand in the way of political possibility.

As an Ohio Republican boss in 1920, Daugherty engineered Harding's ascendancy as the presidential nominee at that year's Republican National Convention in Chicago. The decision to propel Harding forward, if the nomination wasn't decided on the first ballot, was made in what became known in American politics as the smoke-filled room in the Blackstone Hotel. Harding won the nomination after the vote deadlocked between Leonard Wood and Frank Lowden, an event whose possibility Daugherty had suggested months before in an interview. Daugherty subsequently served as campaign manager for Harding in the presidential election of 1920. He ran the campaign based on Harding's affable personality and fairly neutral political stance, advocating a return to "normalcy" after World War I.

=== Attorney General of the United States ===
Following the resounding Republican victory in the fall of 1920, Daugherty was named Attorney General of the United States by President-elect Harding. Daugherty was confirmed by the Senate and assumed office on March 4, 1921.

In the summer of 1922, Daugherty labeled the Great Railroad Strike of 1922 as "a conspiracy worthy of Lenin and Zinoviev". He sent US marshals to aid the railroad companies in their effort to defend their properties and defeat the strike. This action provoked a backlash from many congressmen, and a house committee voted to hear charges of impeachment against Daugherty, though it never resulted in an actual impeachment vote.

=== The "Ohio Gang" ===
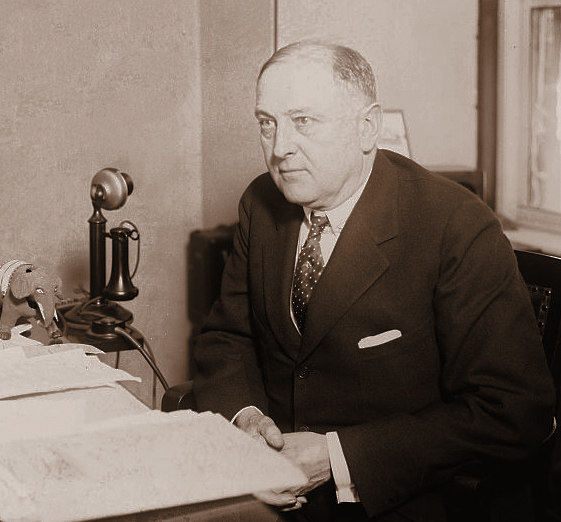
Attorney General Daugherty in his office

Having achieved power, Harding gathered around him a group of political cronies, including factional friends from the Ohio Republican establishment like Daugherty and others of like mind from other states, a group known colloquially as the "Ohio Gang." Critics such as Harding's Secretary of Commerce Herbert Hoover viewed the clique with thinly disguised disgust:

[Harding] had another side which was not good. His political associates had been men of the type of Albert B. Fall, whom he appointed Secretary of the Interior; Daugherty, whom he appointed Attorney General; Forbes, whom he appointed Director of the Veterans' Bureau; Thomas W. Miller, whom he appointed Alien Property Custodian, and Jesse Smith who had office room in the Department of Justice.
He enjoyed the company of these men and his old Ohio associates in and out of the government. Weekly White House poker parties were his greatest relaxation. The stakes were not large, but the play lasted most of the night.... I had lived too long on the frontiers of the world to have strong emotions against people playing poker for money if they liked it, but it irked me to see it in the White House.

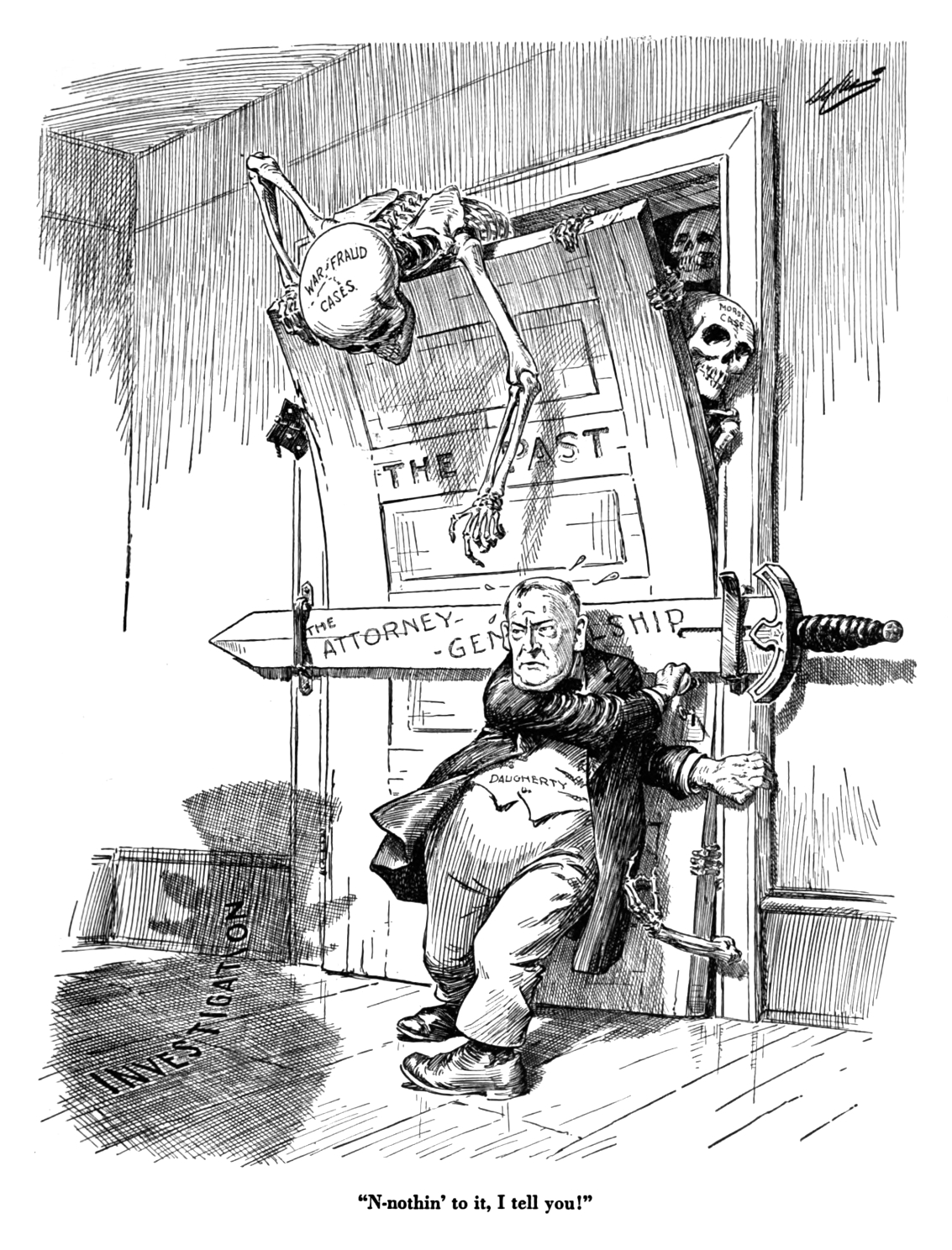
A 1922 Charles Henry Sykes cartoon, whose caption reads, "N-nothin' to it, I tell you!"

Several of Harding's Ohio Gang associates lost no time enriching themselves at the public expense. Soon rumblings began to be heard over possible malfeasance in various government departments, including Daugherty's Department of Justice. Then on April 14, 1922, The Wall Street Journal broke a sensational story about a secret bribery scheme involving oil company kickbacks to government officials in exchange for the granting of extraordinarily favorable oil extraction leases via single-bid contracts. The next day Democratic Senator John B. Kendrick of Wyoming introduced a resolution which set in motion the Senate investigation that would ultimately expose this so-called Teapot Dome scandal, involving an illegal financial relationship between Fall, Harding's Secretary of the Interior, and a subsidiary of the Sinclair Consolidated Oil Corporation.

In May 1922, Arkansas Senator Thaddeus H. Caraway called for Daugherty's resignation because of the role Daugherty had played ten years earlier in procuring a presidential pardon for Charles W. Morse. Morse, a multi-millionaire who had just begun a fifteen-year prison sentence, pretended to be dying in order to plead for a pardon on humanitarian grounds from President William Howard Taft. Because of Morse's wealth and connections, he launched a campaign of lawyers, lobbyists and famous journalists like Clarence W. Barron to urge the President for leniency. Daugherty, hired because of his closeness to Taft, and promised a fee of $100,000 if a pardon were obtained, advanced the scheme by repeatedly telling Taft's secretary that Morse was near death, even stating at one point that Morse would not likely survive another 24 hours. A panel of Army doctors declared that he suffered from Bright's disease and other maladies and would soon die if he remained in prison. Taft signed his pardon, and Morse departed for medical treatment at Wiesbaden. However, it soon became known to the Justice Department that he had feigned illness by drinking a combination of soapsuds and chemicals. Taft later said that the case "shakes one's faith in expert examination." After receiving the pardon Morse lived another 21 years.

Daugherty was also accused by opponents of the administration of having been complicit in the Teapot Dome affair by failing to intervene after he had learned of the malfeasance. A pair of special prosecutors – Republican Assistant Attorney General Owen J. Roberts and former Democratic Senator Atlee Pomerene – were appointed to conduct a more thorough investigation of the matter.

After taking testimony on the matter the pair cleared Daugherty of wrongdoing, their final report indicating that the Attorney General had neither been aware of the fraudulent oil contracts nor had he taken any bribes related to the affair. This very specific absolution did not mean that all was on the level at the Justice Department, however. In July 1923, just as Harding was preparing to leave on a working cruise to Alaska, Daugherty's personal assistant, Jess Smith, whom he was known to have an intimate relationship with, (Note: The two lived, worked, and traveled in the near-constant company of each other, spent days alone in a run-down cabin in the Ohio woods, and assumed roles in Washington social life typically reserved for spouses.) suddenly committed suicide. Although as a pious Quaker, Hoover was never part of the President's inner circle, he was abruptly added to the traveling party on the cruise by a "nervous and distraught" Harding, who apparently sought his counsel.

Hoover later recalled:

One day after lunch when we were a few days out, Harding asked me to come to his cabin. He plumped at me the question: "If you knew of a great scandal in our administration, would you for the good of the country and the party expose it publicly or would you bury it?" My natural reply was "Publish it, and at least get credit for integrity on your side." He remarked that this method might be politically dangerous. I asked for more particulars. He said that he had received some rumors of irregularities, centering around Smith, in connection with cases in the Department of Justice. He had followed the matter up and finally sent for Smith. After a painful session he told Smith that he would be arrested in the morning. Smith went home, burned all his papers, and committed suicide. Harding gave me no information about what Smith had been up to. I asked what Daugherty's relations to the affair were. He abruptly dried up and never raised the question again.

Returning from his Alaskan trip Harding suffered the first heart attack in what would prove to be the beginning of his terminal last days, finally dying in San Francisco on August 2, 1923. Harding's death did nothing to quell the tide of emerging scandals revolving around his Ohio clique, with the news dominated by the story of Teapot Dome bribery and allegations of wrongdoing in the Office of the Alien Property Custodian, the Veterans' Bureau, and the Office of the Attorney General. While new President Calvin Coolidge initially resisted calls to sack Daugherty, Hoover and Secretary of State Charles Evans Hughes prevailed upon him to eliminate a man whom they considered to be a corrupt official. In his memoirs Hoover remembered:

Coolidge was loath to believe that such things were possible. He greatly delayed the removal of Daugherty from the Cabinet. From this man's long-time character, he should never have been in any government.... Coolidge had a high sense of justice and asserted that he had no definite knowledge of wrongdoings by Daugherty and could not remove him on rumors. We urged that Daugherty had lost the confidence of the whole country and himself should be willing to retire for the good of public service.

On March 28, 1924, Coolidge acquiesced, demanding and receiving a letter of resignation from Daugherty. He was quickly replaced as Attorney General by Harlan Fiske Stone, dean of the Columbia Law School.

=== American Metal Company affair ===
In 1926, Daugherty was indicted on charges that he improperly received funds in the sale of American Metal Company assets seized during World War I. The indictment came down one year after Smith, Republican political boss John T. King of Connecticut, and former Alien Property Custodian Thomas W. Miller were charged with the same misconduct. Daugherty's case went to trial twice, with the first jury deadlocking with 7–5 in favor of conviction. He was acquitted after a single juror remained unconvinced of his guilt in the second trial.

=== Midland Bank controversy ===
Daugherty and others in the Harding Administration were implicated by Thomas W. Miller for pressuring him to deposit funds in the Midland National Bank, which Daugherty's brother Mally "Mal" S. Daugherty served as president of, when Daughterty refused to investigate the Teapot Dome Scandal. On January 17, 1927, in the McGrain v. Daugherty ruling, the U.S. Supreme Court upheld a contempt conviction against Mally Daughterty which was related to a contempt citation which was issued against him in 1924. for his refusal to cooperate with a U.S. Senate committee investigating his brother's failures to prosecute the perpetrators in the Teapot Dome Scandal. However, the Supreme Court decision to uphold Mal's contempt conviction would also result in the Midland Bank case against Daugherty passing into history. Mal would later be convicted on March 5, 1931 of a more serious charge of bank fraud related to his Ohio Bank assets, for which he would received a sentence of 10 years in prison.

=== Later years, death, and legacy ===
Daugherty returned to practicing law until his retirement in 1932, and that year published, with ghostwriter Thomas Dixon, The Inside Story of the Harding Tragedy about his time in the Harding administration. In the book he claimed that Fall had become Secretary of the Interior by forging Daugherty's signature, and that Smith, his close friend, had killed himself because of diabetes, not a guilty conscience.

Spending many of his final years in Florida and Mackinac Island, Michigan, Daugherty planned to write more books to clear his reputation, but in October 1940, he suffered two heart attacks and was stricken with pneumonia. Bedridden and blind in one eye during this last year, he died peacefully in his sleep with his son and daughter at his side on October 12, 1941.

Daugherty was buried at Washington Cemetery in Washington Court House, Ohio. Some of his papers, consisting primarily of correspondence between him and President Warren Harding, are housed at the Ohio Historical Society in Columbus.

== Popular culture ==
Daugherty is portrayed by Christopher McDonald on the HBO series Boardwalk Empire. Like the real life Daugherty, the character is portrayed as Warren G. Harding's 1920 campaign manager and later as his Attorney General. He also faces corruption charges and his relationship with Jess Smith and Gaston Means is also shown. Daugherty is also portrayed by Barry Sullivan in the 1979 NBC mini-series Backstairs at the White House. Daugherty is one of several attorneys general featured in MSNOW hostess Rachel Maddow’s 2026 non-fiction book, Department of Fate.

== Works ==
- Respect for Law: Address of Hon. Harry M. Daugherty at the Meeting of the American Bar Association at Cincinnati, Ohio, August 31, 1921. Washington, DC: [U.S. Government Printing Office?], 1921.
- Government Prosecutions under the Espionage Act: Letter from the Attorney General, Transmitting in Response to Senate Resolution of January 25, 1922, Additional Information Regarding Persons Prosecuted by the Government under the Espionage Act or for Conspiracy to Violate War-time Laws ... Washington, DC: U.S. Government Printing Office, 1922.
- Reply by the Attorney General of the United States, Harry M. Daugherty to charges filed with the Committee on the Judiciary of the House of Representatives, December 1, 1922, by Oscar E. Keller. Washington, DC: U.S. Department of Justice, 1922.
- Address by the Attorney General of the United States, Hon. Harry M. Daugherty (at Canton, Ohio, October 21, 1922). Washington, DC: n.p., 1922.
- Speech of Former Attorney General Daugherty and Introductory Remarks of Judge John E. Sater: At Testimonial Dinner Tendered by Business and Professional Men at Hotel Deshler, Columbus, Ohio, April 23rd, 1924. Columbus, OH: n.p., 1924.
- Report Submitted to President Coolidge by Attorney General H. M. Daugherty Concerning Prohibition Litigation throughout U.S., Covering Period Jan. 16, 1920 to June 16, 1923. Washington, DC: U.S. Government Printing Office, 1926.
- The Inside Story of the Harding Tragedy. With Thomas Dixon. New York: Churchill Company, 1932.

== See also ==
- Ohio Gang
- Little Green House on K Street

== Footnotes ==
Legal offices
Preceded by A. Mitchell Palmer	U.S. Attorney General; Served under: Warren G. Harding, Calvin Coolidge; 1921–1924	Succeeded by Harlan Fiske Stone
