= Little Green House on K Street =

House in Washington, D.C.

Coordinates: 38°54′10.2″N 77°2′14.4″W

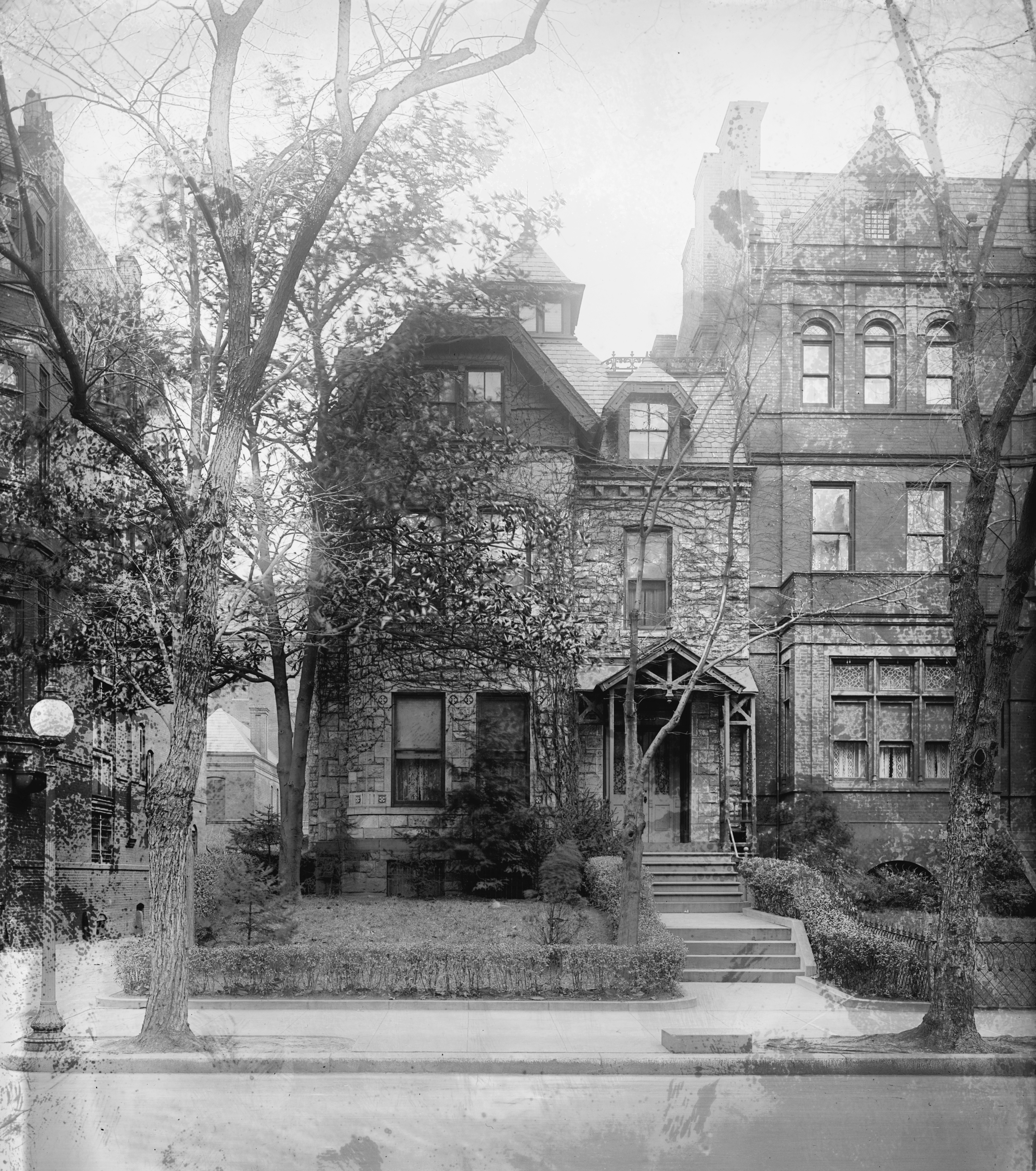
- 1625 K Street in the early 1920s
- Interactive map of the Little Green House on K Street area

General information
- Location: 1625 K Street, NW, Washington, DC, United States
- Completed: 1880
- Demolished: 1941

The Little Green House on K Street was a residence at 1625 K Street, NW, Washington, D.C., United States, where several prominent figures associated with the Harding administration are alleged to have engaged in corrupt schemes between 1921 and 1923.

== History ==
The Little Green House on K Street was constructed in 1880 by a retired attorney, J. B. Edmonds of Iowa.

The house was rented by associates of President Harding's Attorney General Harry Daugherty, including Jess Smith and Howard Mannington, known as the Ohio Gang. According to testimony before the Senate Committee investigating the Teapot Dome bribery scandal, it was the gang's unofficial headquarters, where many of the deals were hatched. The testimony before the Senate Committee broke down when the key witness, Roxie Stinson, admitted before the committee that she had never even seen the "little green house". The investigation was further undermined when the other key witness, Gaston Means, retracted his entire testimony in an affidavit. He admitted to jointly coaching Stinson in her testimony along with Senator Burton Wheeler.

The building was razed in 1941 to make way for the 12-story Commonwealth Building.

== Legacy ==
The name entered the American lexicon as a symbol of political corruption and cronyism. The Chicago Tribune described the home as one of "the symbols of a nation's disgrace".

In 1934, Congressman Fred Britten, a Republican of Illinois, famously compared the Red House on R Street in Georgetown, where the original New Dealers strategized during the early years of the Franklin D. Roosevelt Administration, to the Little Green House on K Street. The R Street address became known as the Brain Trust's Little Green House on K Street.

During the scandal involving the extramarital affairs of Senator John Ensign and Congressman Chip Pickering in 2009, commentators frequently compared their C Street homes to the Little Green House on K Street.
