= Office of Naval Petroleum and Oil Shale Reserves =

Office of the U.S. Department of Energy

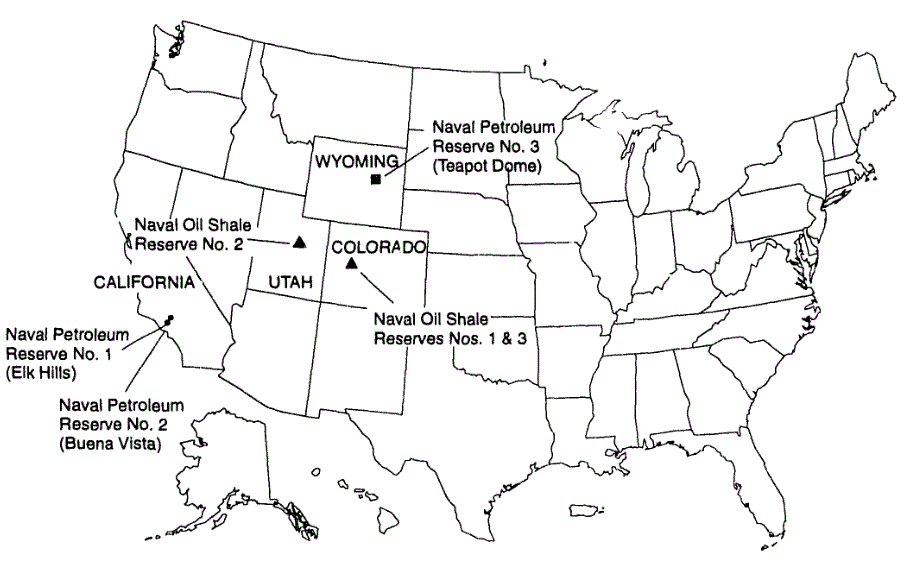
Naval Petroleum and Oil Shale Reserves, 1992.

The United States Office of Naval Petroleum and Oil Shale Reserves, established in 1927, is a division of the U.S. Department of Energy, responsible for analyzing and monitoring the U.S.'s oil shale reserves.

The Pickett Act of 1910 authorized President William Howard Taft to withdraw large areas of potential oil-bearing lands in California and Wyoming as sources of fuel for the U.S. Navy. On July 2, 1910, President Taft set aside federal lands believed to contain oil as an emergency reserve for the U.S. Navy. The Reserves were initially under the control of the U.S. Department of the Interior, but in 1920, the U.S. Navy's Fuel Oil Office assumed responsibility for the Reserves. A year later, President Warren Harding placed the Reserves back under the Department of Interior, only to have the Teapot Dome Scandal force control back to the U.S. Navy. In 1927, the first Office of the Naval Petroleum and Oil Shale Reserves was officially created within the U.S. Navy. The U.S. Navy maintained ownership of the Reserves until their transfer by the Department of Energy Organization Act of 1977 to the U.S. Department of Energy.

== See also ==
- National Petroleum Reserve–Alaska
