= Teapot Dome scandal =

1921–1923 U.S. political bribery scandal

- Part of the presidency of Warren G. Harding and the Ohio Gang
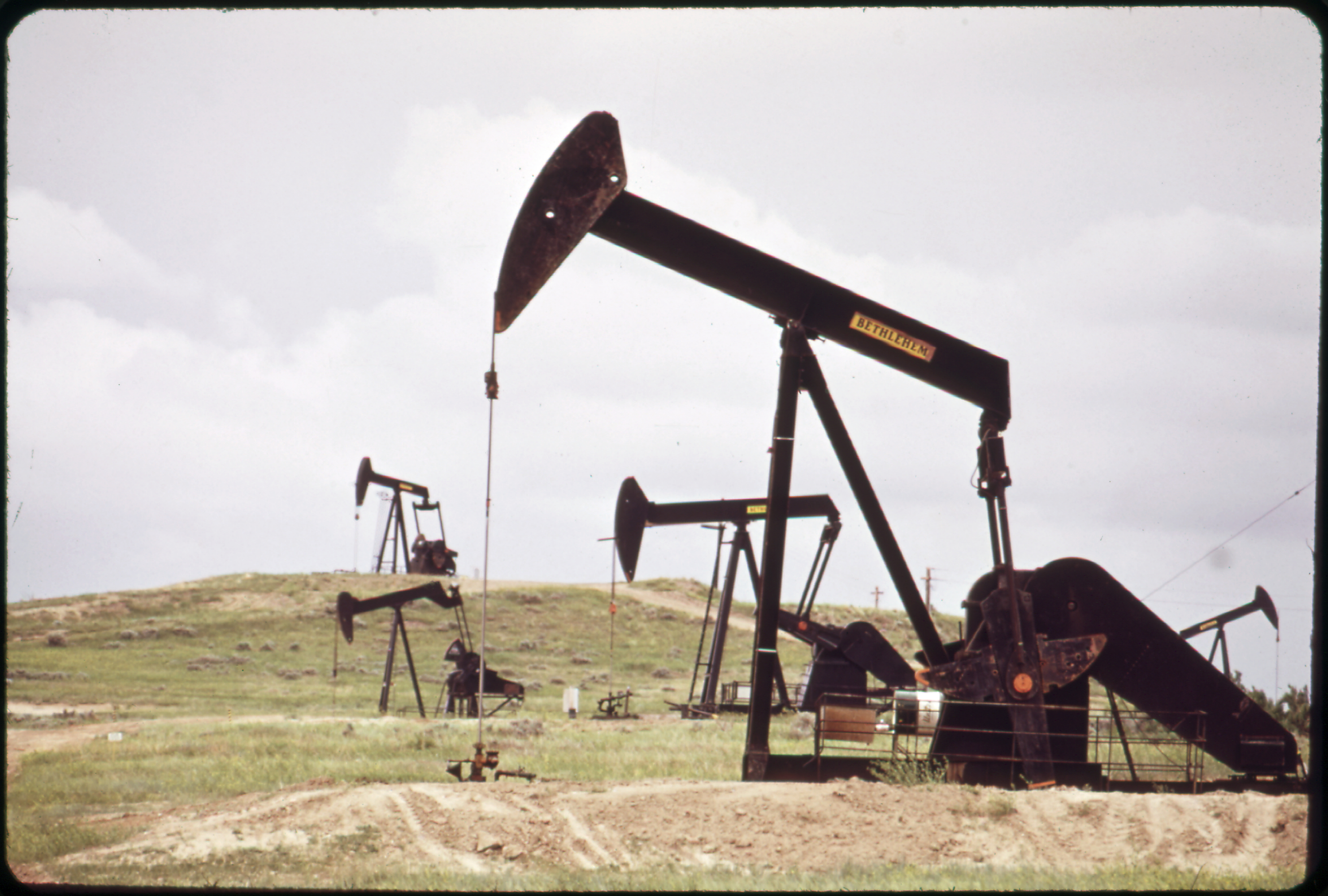
- Oil wells near Teapot Dome in Wyoming (1973)
- Date: March 6, 1923 – October 14, 1929
- Participants: Harding administration, particularly Albert B. Fall, and oil executive Harry Ford Sinclair

The Teapot Dome scandal was a political corruption scandal in the United States during the 1920s involving the administration of President Warren G. Harding. It centered on Albert B. Fall, the Secretary of the Interior, who accepted bribes from private oil companies to lease government-owned petroleum reserves that had been set aside by President William Howard Taft to create the Naval Petroleum Reserves. This was a critical new initiative of the Federal government to ensure that a navy transitioning from coal to oil propulsion would have sufficient stocks of fuel in times of war.

Fall was given control over reserves at Teapot Dome in Wyoming, as well as two locations in California, upon the recommendation of Secretary of the Navy Edwin Denby. The leases were the subject of a congressional investigation led by Senator Thomas J. Walsh. Convicted of accepting bribes from the oil companies, Fall became the first presidential cabinet member to go to prison, but no one was convicted of paying the bribes.

Before the Watergate scandal, Teapot Dome was regarded as the "greatest and most sensational scandal in the history of American politics". In response to the scandal, Congress subsequently passed permanent legislation granting itself subpoena power over tax records of any U.S. citizen, regardless of position. These laws are also considered to have empowered Congress generally.

== History ==
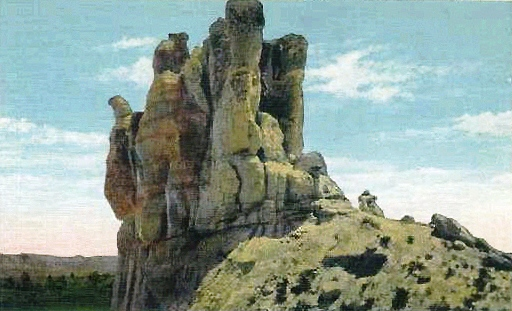
Teapot Dome (including Teapot Rock) around the time of the scandal, depicted in a c. 1922 postcard.

To ensure that the Navy would always have enough fuel, President Taft designated several oil-producing areas as naval oil reserves. In 1921, President Harding issued an executive order to transfer control of Teapot Dome Oil Field in Natrona County, Wyoming, as well as the Elk Hills and Buena Vista Oil Fields in Kern County, California, from the Department of the Navy to the Department of the Interior. This was not implemented until the next year, when Interior Secretary Fall persuaded Edwin C. Denby, the Navy Secretary, to carry out the order.

Later in 1922, Fall leased oil production rights at Teapot Dome to Harry F. Sinclair of Mammoth Oil, a subsidiary of Sinclair Oil Corporation. He also leased the Elk Hills reserve to Edward L. Doheny of Pan American Petroleum and Transport Company. Both leases were issued without competitive bidding, which was legal under the Mineral Leasing Act of 1920.

The lease terms were very favorable to the oil companies, and secret transactions associated with the two deals made Fall a rich man. He received a no-interest loan from Doheny of $100,000 in November 1921 (equivalent to $1.81 million in 2025). He received other gifts from Doheny and Sinclair totaling about $404,000 (equivalent to $7.29 million in 2025). Among the payments traced to Fall by special prosecutors Atlee Pomerene and Owen J. Roberts was $90,000 in Liberty bonds from the Continental Trading Company, Ltd. of Canada, a Sinclair-connected organization, bringing his total financial enrichment during his 2.5 years as Interior Secretary to at least $239,000 (equivalent to $10.72 million in 2025) above his government salary. While the leases were legal, these transactions were not. Fall attempted to keep them secret, but a sudden improvement in his standard of living raised suspicions; he paid up his ranch taxes, for example, which had been as much as 10 years past due. Carl Magee, who later founded The Albuquerque Tribune, wrote about this sudden affluence and also brought it to the attention of the Senate investigation.

== Investigation and outcome ==
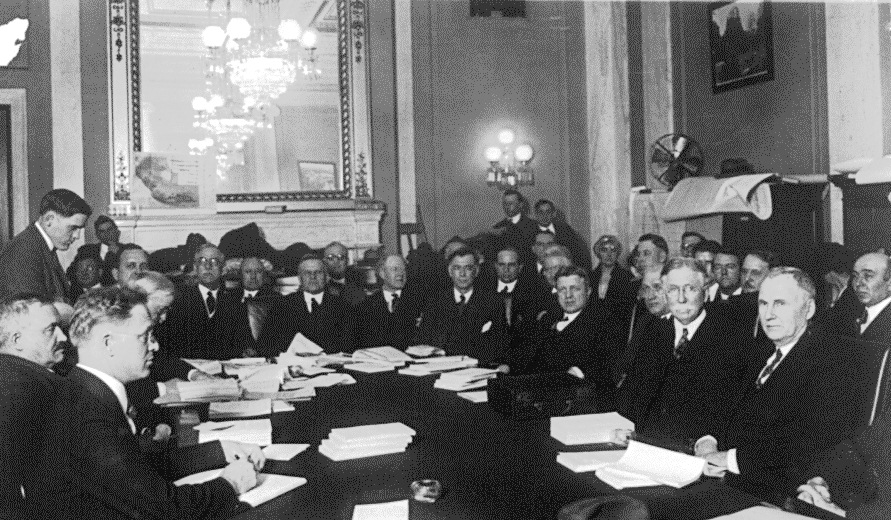
Oil businessman Edward L. Doheny (at table, second from right) testifying before the U.S. Senate committee investigating the Teapot Dome oil leases in 1924

In April 1922, a small-time Wyoming oil operator wrote to his senator, John B. Kendrick, angered that Sinclair had been given a contract to the lands in a secret deal and without the opportunity for other oil companies to submit competitive bids for the lease. Kendrick sent Secretary Fall a formal letter requesting a statement of facts concerning the Teapot Dome transaction; Fall did not reply. On April 12, Kendrick introduced a resolution in the Senate calling for an investigation into the deal. The Department of the Interior released a public statement several days later announcing the Teapot Dome and Elk Hills contracts, and stated that these transactions were necessary because "oil was being drained from these reserves in very large quantities, amounting to millions of dollars of loss up to the present time, by wells on adjoining lands, and that in a few years the government well would be depleted". On April 21, Secretary Fall finally responded to Kendrick's letter, claiming that these lease negotiations had required "secrecy" for reasons involving "the national defense".

In March 1923, the U.S. Senate launched their first investigation into Teapot Dome. Republican Senator Robert M. La Follette of Wisconsin led an investigation by the Senate Committee on Public Lands. At first, La Follette believed Fall was innocent. However, his suspicions were aroused after his own office in the Senate Office Building was ransacked.

Democratic Senator Thomas J. Walsh of Montana, the most junior member of the minority, led a lengthy inquiry. For two years, Walsh pushed forward while Fall stepped backward, covering his tracks as he went. No evidence of wrongdoing was initially uncovered, as the leases were legal enough, but records kept disappearing mysteriously. By 1924, the remaining unanswered question was how Fall had become so rich so quickly and easily.

Harding-era U.S. Attorney General Harry M. Daugherty and others in the Administration were implicated by Thomas W. Miller, the Alien Property Custodian, for pressuring him to deposit funds in Daugherty's brother Mally "Mal" Daugherty's Midland National Bank. During the Senate investigation, coded messages that had passed between figures in the scandal were decoded by E. B. Bennett, chief editorial writer of the Washington Post. Bennett testified that "WYFGE" in the messages referred to Attorney General Daugherty, and that he had assisted efforts to prevent Senator McLean from testifying before the committee.

On January 17, 1927, in the McGrain v. Daugherty ruling, the U.S. Supreme Court upheld a contempt conviction against Mally Daugherty for his refusal to cooperate with a U.S. Senate committee investigating his brother's failures to prosecute the perpetrators in the Teapot Dome Scandal.

Money from the bribes had gone to Fall's cattle ranch and investments in his business. Finally, as the investigation was winding down with Fall apparently innocent, Walsh uncovered a piece of evidence Fall had failed to cover up: Doheny's $100,000 interest-free loan to him. This discovery broke open the scandal. Civil and criminal suits related to the scandal continued throughout the 1920s. In 1927, the Supreme Court ruled that the oil leases had been corruptly obtained. The Court invalidated the Elk Hills lease in February 1927 and the Teapot Dome lease in October 1927. Both reserves were returned to the Navy.

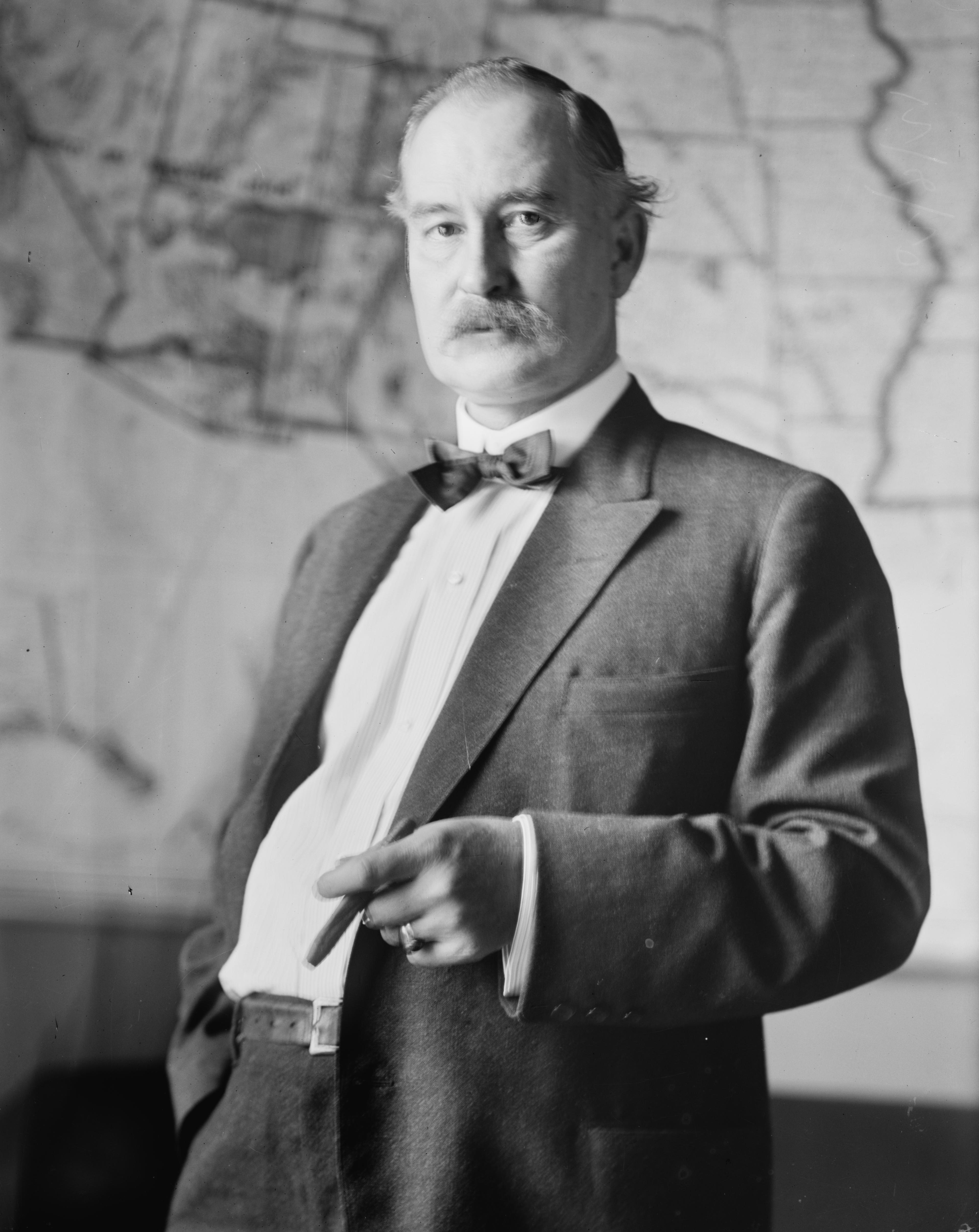
Albert B. Fall, as a result of the scandal, was the first U.S. cabinet official sentenced to prison.

In 1929, Fall was found guilty of accepting bribes from Doheny. Conversely, in 1930, Doheny was acquitted of paying bribes to Fall. Further, Doheny's corporation foreclosed on Fall's home in the Tularosa Basin of New Mexico, because of "unpaid loans" that turned out to be that same $100,000 bribe. Sinclair served six months in jail on a charge of jury tampering.

Although Fall was to blame for this scandal, Harding's reputation was permanently sullied because of his involvement with people associated with it. Evidence proving Fall's guilt only arose after Harding died in 1923.

The Teapot Dome oil field was idle for 49 years following the scandal, but went back into production in 1976. After Teapot Dome had earned over $569 million in revenue from the 22 million barrels (3,500,000 m^{3}) of oil extracted over the previous 39 years, the Department of Energy in February 2015 sold the oil field for $45 million to New York–based Stranded Oil Resources Corp.

== Legacy ==
The scandal occurred before Calvin Coolidge assumed the presidency upon Harding's death, and his handling of the resulting investigations helped him to gain a reputation for honesty and integrity; Coolidge easily won the 1924 United States presidential election.

The Revenue Act of 1924 gave the chairman of the United States House Committee on Ways and Means the power to obtain the tax records of any taxpayer. The Federal Corrupt Practices Act, which regulates campaign finance, was strengthened in 1925, and the Supreme Court's 1927 ruling in McGrain v. Daugherty explicitly established that Congress had the power to compel testimony.

== Comparison ==
The Teapot Dome scandal has historically been regarded as the worst such scandal in the United States – the "high water mark" of government corruption. It is often used as a benchmark for comparison with subsequent scandals. In particular, it has been compared to the Watergate scandal, in which a cabinet member, Attorney General John N. Mitchell, went to prison after being found guilty of conspiracy, obstruction of justice, and perjury, the second time in American history that a member of the cabinet has been incarcerated.

== See also ==
- Little Green House on K Street
- List of federal political scandals in the United States
- Teapot Dome Service Station
- United States v. Midwest Oil Co.
