= List of supper clubs =

This is a list of supper clubs. A supper club is a traditional dining establishment that also functions as a social club. The term may describe different establishments depending on the region, but in general, supper clubs tend to present themselves as having a high-class image, even if the price is affordable to all. A newer usage of the term supper club has emerged, referring to underground restaurants.

Supper clubs are more formal than casual restaurants and bars.

== Supper clubs ==
- 500 Club – a former a nightclub and supper club at 6 Missouri Avenue in Atlantic City, New Jersey, United States, that operated from the 1930s until the building burned down in 1973. The 500 Club became one of the most popular nightspots on the East Coast, regularly attracting top-name talent. Performers included Frank Sinatra, Sammy Davis Jr., Martin and Lewis, the Will Mastin Trio, Jimmy Durante, Eartha Kitt, Sophie Tucker, the Jackie Paris Trio, Milton Berle, Nat King Cole, and Liberace, among many others.

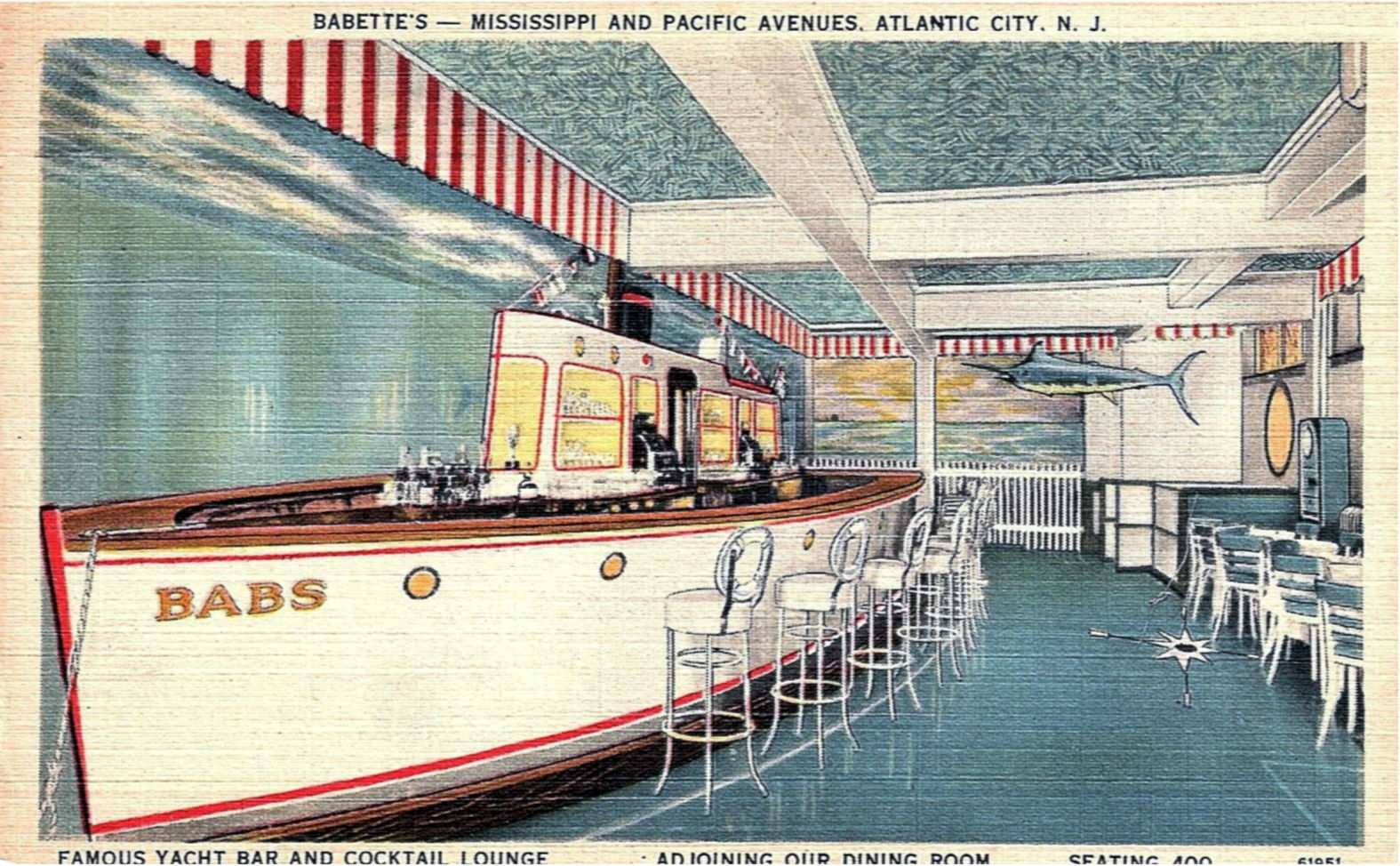
A postcard of the bar at Babette's

- Babette's – also known as Babette's Supper Club, it was a supper club and bar at 2211 Pacific Avenue on the Boardwalk of Atlantic City, New Jersey. It operated from the early 1920s onwards and was sold in 1950. The bar was designed like a ship's hull. In the backroom was a gambling den, which was investigated by the federal authorities and raided in 1943.
- Bagdad Supper Club – a theater and entertainment venue located on north side of what then was U.S. Route 80, but now is U.S. Route 180, east of Grand Prairie, Texas, at the corner of Bagdad Road and Main Street, it opened Thanksgiving Day 1928 and was an opulent palatial facility that offered dining, dancing, and music.
- Catalina Bar & Grill – also called Catalina Jazz Club, it is a prominent jazz club and restaurant on Sunset Boulevard in Hollywood, Los Angeles, California
- Chez Ami Supper Club – also called The Chez Ami, it was a former supper club located at 311 Delaware Avenue in Buffalo, New York that opened 1934. The interior of Chez Ami was designed by C. Theodore Macheras who used art-deco elements of mirrors, neon, indirect lighting and plush carpeting to achieve a modern entertainment experience. The centerpiece of Chez Ami was a revolving bar, purported to be the first of its kind in America, and- took 7 ½ minutes to make a complete cycle.
- Club Saint-Germain – a former jazz club located at 13 rue Saint-Benoît in the 6e arrondissement de Paris, it was opened in 1947 by Boris Vian and staged central figures in the French jazz scene such as Barney Wilen, René Urtreger, Django Reinhardt, and Pierre Michelot throughout the 1940s, 1950s, and 1960s. The building of the defunct Club Saint-Germain is now home to the supper club Bilboquet.
- Delilah – a "modern supper club" with locations in Las Vegas (within Wynn Las Vegas), California and Miami.
- Evans Music-and-Supper Rooms – a former entertainment venue for music and singing in early nineteenth century that was located at 43 King Street, Covent Garden, London, England.
- The Fainting Club – a members-only supper club for women founded in 2014 by artist Zoe Crosher, it started in Los Angeles and now has chapters worldwide including in New York, Mexico City, London, Berlin, Paris and Hong Kong.

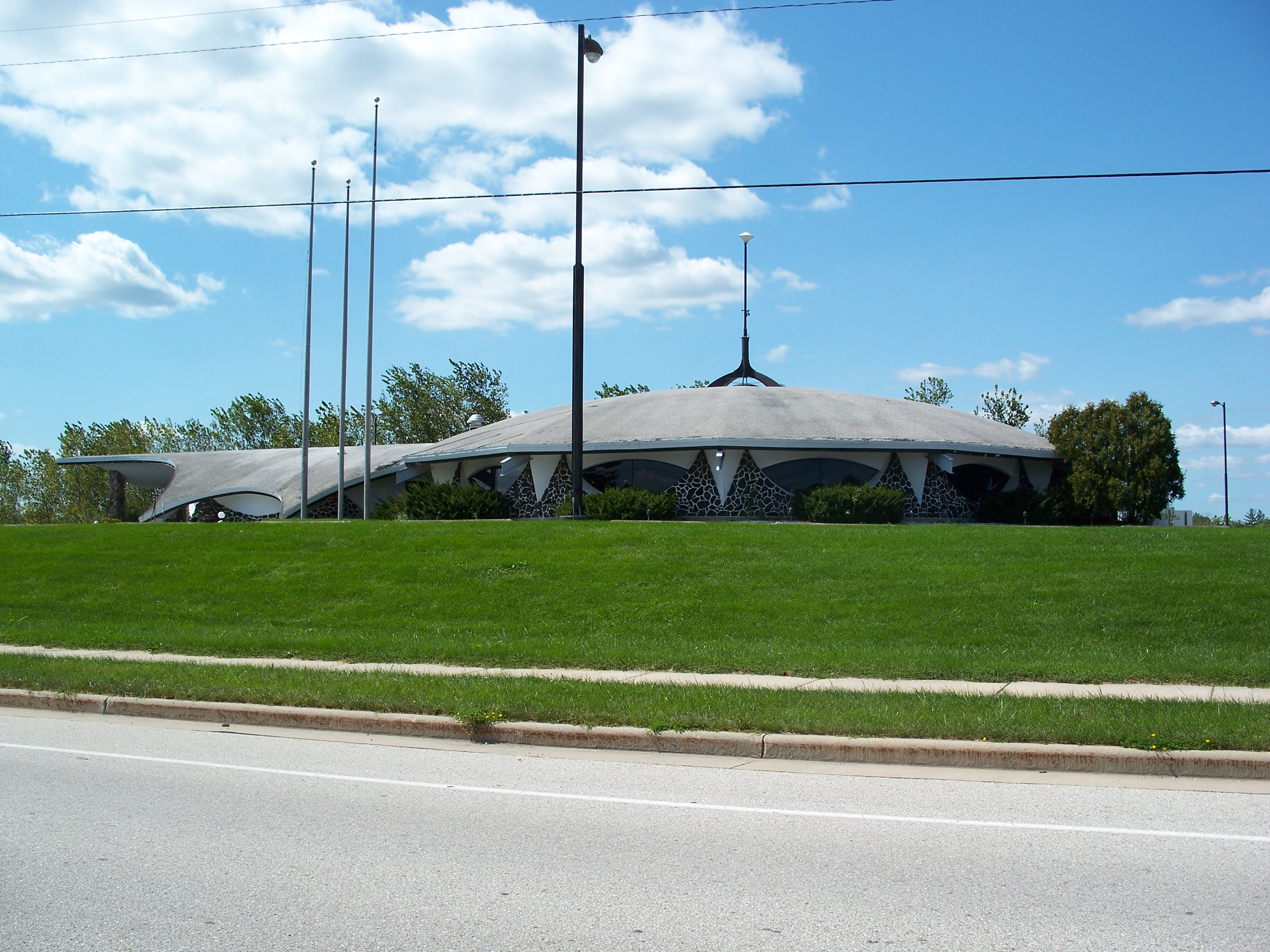
The building of the former The Gobbler supper club

- The Gobbler – a former motel, supper club, and roadside attraction in Johnson Creek, Wisconsin, United States. It was designed in the late 1960s by Fort Atkinson architect Helmut Ajango for local poultry processor Clarence Hartwig and opened in 1967. It included a rotating circular bar that completed one revolution every 80 minutes. The Gobbler was reopened in December 2015 as the Gobbler Theater.
- Gus Stevens Seafood Restaurant & Buccaneer Lounge – a former restaurant and supper club in Biloxi, Mississippi, its restaurant building was constructed with a Moroccan architecture style turret. It was famous in the 1950s and 1960s and hosted many famous entertainers, including Andy Griffith, Mel Torme, Rudy Vallee, and Jerry Lee Lewis. It is also well known as the last place where Jayne Mansfield performed; she died early the next morning in a car crash while being driven from the club.
- The Holiday House. Winding up as a 900-seat showroom in Monroeville, Pa, 15 mi. east of downtown Pittsburgh, the facility housed a hotel, several eateries in addition to the showroom, several themed bars, a comedy club, disco, and several small businesses including a Hong Kong Tailor. The showroom was usually open with a headline act for two shows Tuesday thru Saturday, featuring top tier talent. The room closed in 1981 and the property was developed as a shopping center.
- McVan's, a supper club and live music venue, located at the corner of Niagara Street and Hertel Avenue in Buffalo, New York. It operated from 1922 until 1984. Over its decades of operation, McVan's evolved from a supper‐club entertainment venue featuring jazz and blues artists of the day such as Nat King Cole, Ella Fitzgerald, Art Tatum to rock acts such as Jimi Hendrix, and later became a focal point of Buffalo's original rock, punk, and alternative music scenes.
- Metropolitan Opera Club – a private social club within the Metropolitan Opera House in New York that was founded in 1893 and incorporated in 1899. The club maintains its own dining room that was designed by Angelo Donghia and later renovated by Peter Pennoyer. The club was founded in 1893 when a collection of New York Society gentlemen created a private supper club in a lobby of the old Metropolitan Opera House on West 39th Street while the back of the house was under renovation after a fire. Known as the "Vaudeville Club", members and their guests dined and watched performances from a miniature stage designed by Stanford White, a founding member.
- Pigalle Club – a former supper club and live music venue in Piccadilly, London, owned by John Vincent Power. It closed in 2012.
- The Royal Box - a popular supper club at the Americana Hotel in Manhattan, New York City. Opened in October 1962 with a performance by Harry Belafonte, it hosted numerous jazz singers and comedians over the years, and closed in 1979 when the hotel was sold to Sheraton.

Patrons at the Shore Club having a lobster supper

- Smoke Jazz & Supper-Club Lounge – an influential jazz club based on the Upper West Side of New York City, it was founded on April 9, 1999
- Song and supper room – a former dining club in Victorian England in which entertainment and good food were provided. They provided an alternative to formal theatre and music hall with a good convivial atmosphere in which the customers were encouraged to perform themselves.
- Time Supper Club – the first supper club in Montreal, Quebec, Canada, it gradually turned into a night club
- Triad Theatre – formerly known as Palsson's Supper Club, Steve McGraw's, and Stage 72 it is a performing arts venue located on West 72nd Street on New York's Upper West Side
- Volxkuche, VoKu, peoples kitchen, free supper club and kitchen for all are names used by the alternative scene (left) for a weekly or regularly occurring group cooking event, at which the meal is served free of charge or at cost. The name derives from the German expression "people's kitchen" (soup kitchen), as a secular counterpart of the Christian soup kitchen.

== Germany ==
- Supperclub72, Wört (est. 2022)* - is a private dining experience based in Wört, Germany. The club offers multi-course menus focusing on seasonal and regional ingredients, served in an intimate home setting. Events are held several times per year, combining a curated atmosphere with an emphasis on culinary craftsmanship. Attendance is limited and typically by invitation or reservation. Official website

== See also ==
- AirDine – a supper club mobile app based on the sharing economy principles where individuals stand as both supplier and customer, similar to Airbnb in the short time rental market.
- Lists of restaurants
