= The Fainting Club =

21st-century women's dinner club

The Fainting Club is a members-only supper club for women, founded in 2014 by artist Zoe Crosher. Described as an "old boys' club, for girls", it celebrates and draws creative women from multiple disciplines—artists, writers, filmmakers, chefs, musicians—and welcomes any like-minded souls. The club was named for an encounter Crosher had where a group of women came together to help another woman who had fainted.

Started in Los Angeles and based on the belief that strong, interesting and intelligent women are more powerful as a group, the club has expanded internationally. It now has chapters worldwide including in New York, Mexico City, London, Berlin, Paris, and Hong Kong. All new members must be invited in person or, if distance prevents this, verbally, as connection and conversation are key to the club's purpose. The only requirements for joining are a generous, collaborative spirit and a willingness to support other women.

== See also ==
- List of supper clubs
