= Grannis (surname) =

Grannis (variation Granniss) is a surname. Notable people with the surname include:

- Elizabeth Bartlett Grannis (1840–1926), American editor, publisher and suffragist
- Kina Grannis (born 1985), American singer-songwriter
- LeRoy Grannis (1917–2011), American photographer
- Susanna Grannis (born 1937), American academic
- Paul Grannis (born 1938), American physicist
- Pete Grannis (born 1942/1943), American politician
- Ruth S. Granniss (1872-1954), American librarian
