= Grace Choy =

Hong Kong chef

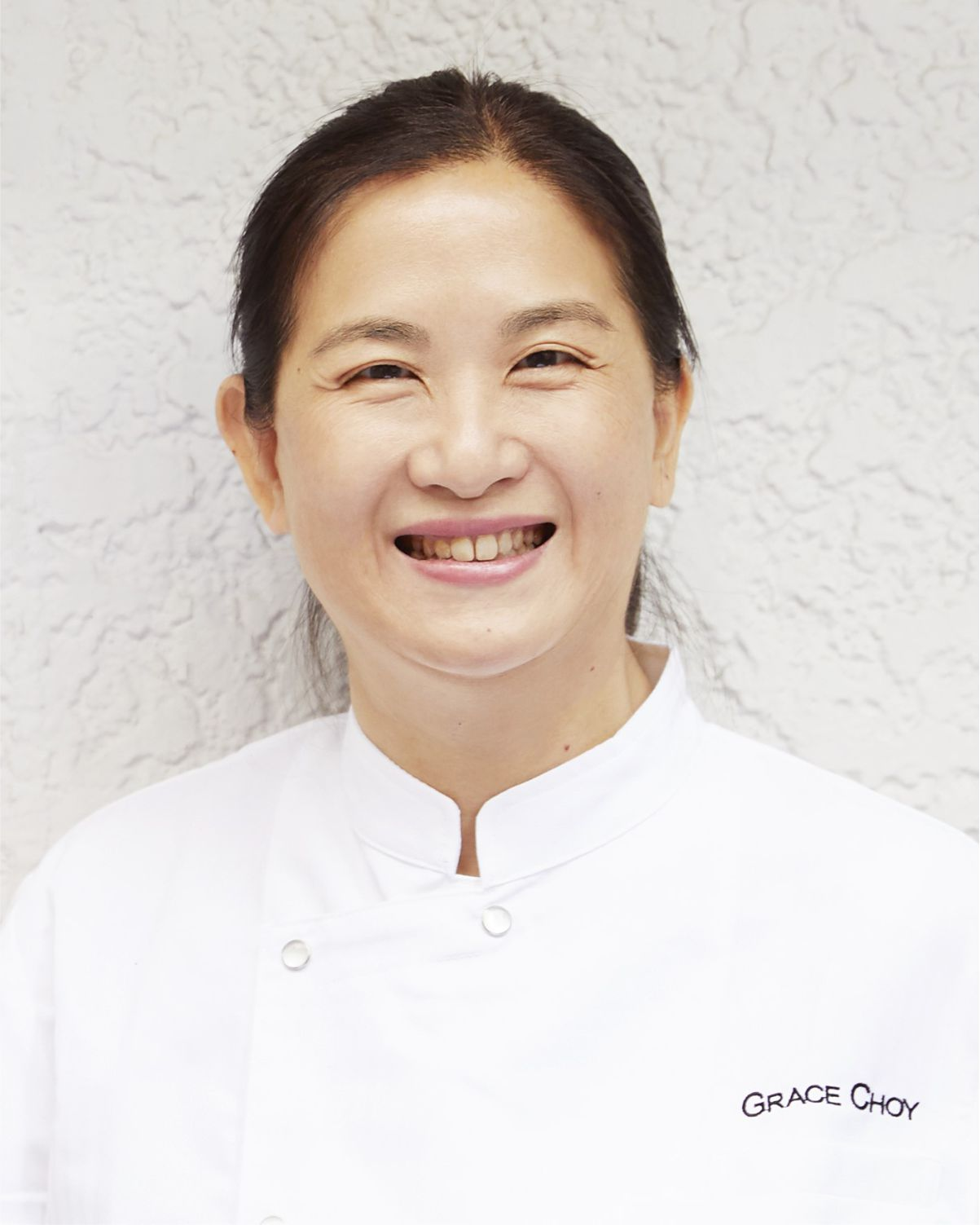
Grace Choy in 2024

Grace Choy (traditional Chinese: 蔡孫美華; simplified Chinese: 蔡孙美华; born 1967) is a Hong Kong chef.

== Early life ==
Choy was born in 1967 in New Territories, Hong Kong. She has four brothers and one sister and is the second-youngest of the siblings. Her parents ran a business selling mahjong sets and tables, but her father died when she was five years old. Her mother raised six children by herself. Choy received a diploma in secretarial information management at a university in the United Kingdom. Choy did administrative work for 10 years. She married Ken in 1998 and moved with him to Guangdong and Northeast China, assisting him with his Mainland Chinese business. She returned to Hong Kong in 2006 and joined Miele as an administrator in 2008 where she worked for two years.

== Career ==
Choy started her restaurant after she had been fired three times from various office jobs, after which she was diagnosed with ADHD.

Choy started a 16-seat restaurant in Yuen Long in 2011. Named ChoyChoy (Chinese: 蔡菜館), the restaurant served Hong Kong cuisine and offered breakfast and light meals at the beginning. CNN and The South China Morning Post said ChoyChoy was one of Hong Kong's top private kitchens. ChoyChoy relocated to Nishi azabu, Tokyo, in 2019.

Choy moved to Tokyo in 2019 and started ChoyChoy in Roppongi. ChoyChoy Kitchen relocated to Aobadai, Meguro, Tokyo. The restaurant can accommodate four guests.

In 2018, she wrote the cookbook Grace's 60 Recipes, which was awarded "Best Woman Chef Book" by Gourmand World Cookbook Awards in 2019.
