= Babette's =

Restaurant in Atlantic City, New Jersey

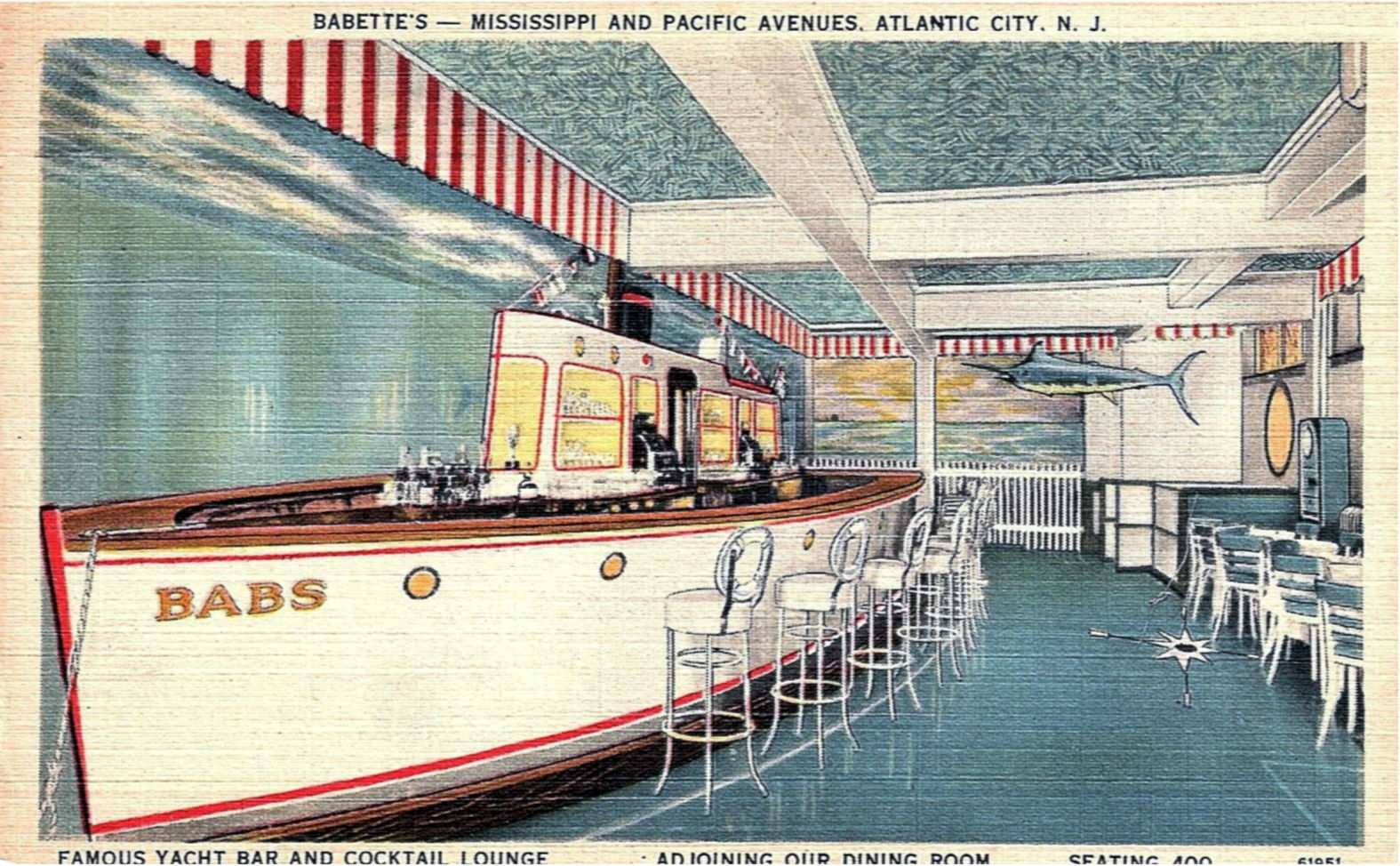
- Bar at Babette's

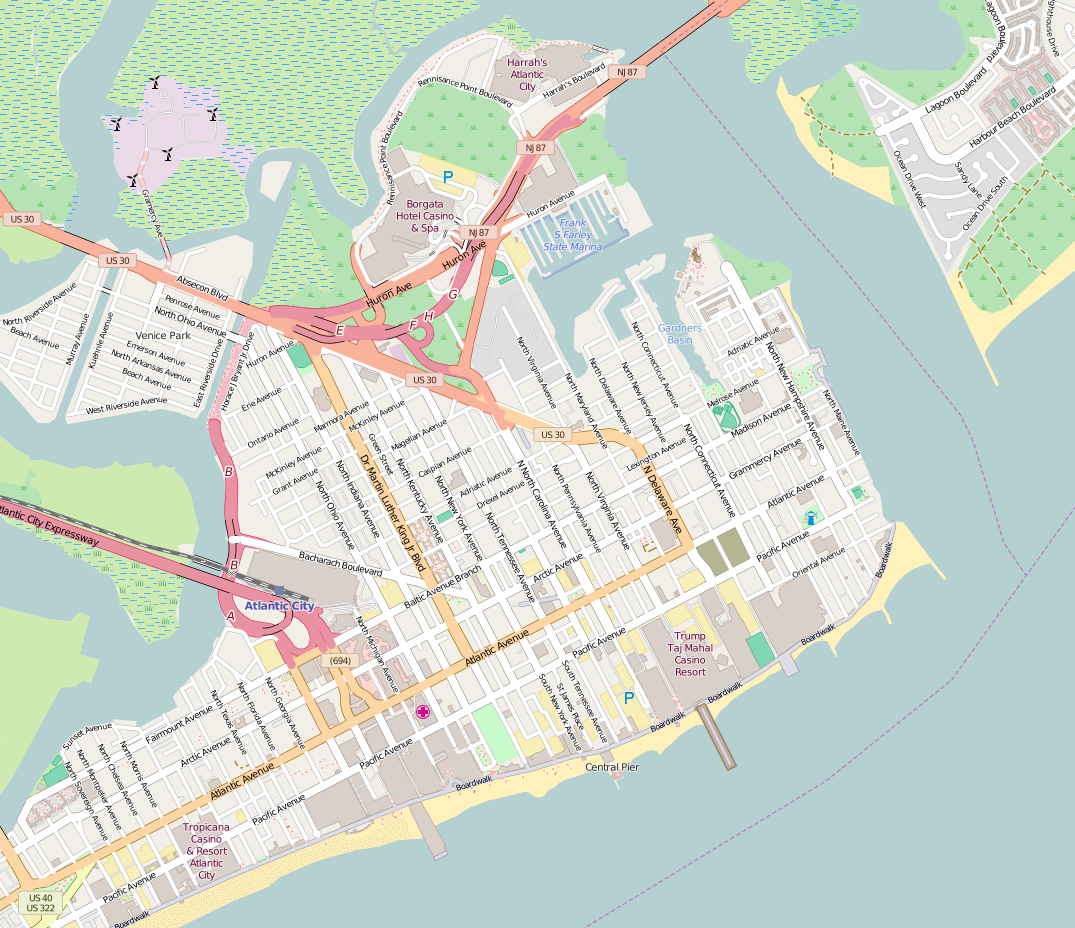
- Location in Atlantic City
- Former names: The Golden Inn
- Address: 2211 Pacific Avenue; Atlantic City, New Jersey; United States
- Coordinates: 39°21′22″N 74°26′15″W
- Owner: Dan Stebbins
- Capacity: 400
- Type: Supper club and bar

Construction
- Opened: Early 1920s
- Closed: After 1950

Babette's or Babette's Supper Club was a supper club and bar at 2211 Pacific Avenue on the Boardwalk of Atlantic City, New Jersey, United States. It operated from the early 1920s onwards and was sold in 1950. The bar was designed like a ship's hull. In the backroom was a gambling den, which was investigated by the federal authorities and raided in 1943.

== History ==
The club, situated on Pacific Avenue, opposite the Atlantic City Convention Hall, operated from the early 1920s through to the 1940s. Originally called the Golden Inn, it was renamed by owner Dan Stebbins to Babette's after he married showgirl Blanche Babbitt, who used the stage name Babette. (Note: The venue was also known as the Yacht bar. In 1921, Nucky Johnson incurred the wrath of publisher William Randolph Hearst by insulting Hearst's mistress, Marion Davies. One version of the event places Johnson, Hearst and Davies at the Yacht bar.) She used her talents for costume creation, music arranging and choreography to improve the club's stage presentations.

The club was a venue for Earl Lindsay's "All American Revue", and was described by Billboard as "one of the resort's leading cabarets". The floor show included a chorus line and singers. There was a small dance floor. Milton Berle, Eleanor Powell, and comedian Joe Penner were among those appearing on stage; Al Capone and New York mayor Jimmy Walker were known to have visited the club. The supper club was also a favorite of New Jersey boss Nucky Johnson, who often arrived at the club with a showgirl on each arm. There was a minimum cover charge for entering the main showroom beyond the bar. The supper club menu featured seafood dinners and charcoal-broiled steaks.

Entertainer Buddy Ebsen got his show business start at Babette's. His sister, Vilma, had been hired to dance at Babette's. Ebsen joined her in Atlantic City; he tried getting work at the various clubs and at the minstrel show at Steel Pier but was unsuccessful at getting hired for any entertainment work. Ebsen was allowed to dance at Babette's with his sister one evening because it was thought the patrons would be amused by it. Vaudevillian Benny Davis was in the audience that night. Davis was compiling a cast to work at various movie theaters throughout the US. He signed both Ebsens, and they worked for some time dancing at theaters in the eastern US. The Ebsens then went on to work in the Ziegfeld Follies.

== Interior and illegal gambling ==
A nautical theme played throughout the establishment. A distinguishing feature of the bar was that it was designed like a ship's hull with portholes and named "Babs". The club sported a large collection of 500-pound (230 kg) tunas belonging to Stebbins. The furnishings and fittings were "electric blue and chromium".

Though considered one of the city's most upmarket clubs, Babette's gained a reputation for hosting illegal gambling, prompting a federal investigation in the 1930s. There was a backroom at Babette's containing card tables and horse-race betting, which was illegal at the time. The gambling den attracted the high rollers of the period; Astors, Vanderbilts and others from New York's social register could be found in the rooms at Babette's. Stebbins was able to protect his casino business by his connections with politicians and those in the legal profession. His niece Gloria Vallee recalled in 1980 that the venue was continually being raided by police, but they would tip her uncle off that there would be a raid, so he could protect his clients. The mode of escaping the police was to exit through a trap door in the horse betting room. This led to a staircase to the roof. The gamblers crossed the roof and came down another flight of stairs on the side of the building which led into the Stebbins' home. In 1943, Babette's was raided by the authorities and booking equipment was confiscated. Stebbins was fined several thousand dollars for facilitating illegal gambling.

== Sale and legacy ==
In May 1950, Stebbins sold the club to the Rajan Corporation, after nearly 30 years of ownership. He died in 1960, and Blanche in 1963.

The Trump Plaza Hotel and Casino now occupies the site. In 2010 the club was featured in the Martin Scorsese–directed pilot episode of the HBO crime drama Boardwalk Empire, set in prohibition-era Atlantic City. The bar depicted in the television series was based on a Mississippi River paddleboat, which was a different style than the bar at Babette's.

== See also ==
- List of supper clubs

== Sources ==
- Davis, Ed (1986). Atlantic City Diary: A Century of Memories, 1880-1985. Siracusa Real Estate & Insurance Co. ISBN 978-0-9614585-1-5.
- Hart, Steven (25 October 2013). American Dictators: Frank Hague, Nucky Johnson, and the Perfection of the Urban Political Machine. Rutgers University Press. ISBN 978-0-8135-6214-8.
- Karmel, James R. (2015). Gambling on the American Dream: Atlantic City and the Casino Era. Routledge. ISBN 978-1-3173-1462-2.
- Schnitzspahn, Karen L. (2012). Jersey Shore Food History: Victorian Feasts to Boardwalk Treats. The History Press. ISBN 978-1-60949-507-7.
- Van Meter, Jonathan (2004). The Last Good Time: Skinny D'Amato, the Notorious 500 Club, and the Rise and Fall of Atlantic City. Crown Publishing Group. ISBN 978-1-4000-5297-4.
- Wallace, John (2012). Boardwalk Empire A-Z: The totally unofficial guide to accompany the hit HBO series. John Blake Publishing. ISBN 978-1857826951.
- Waltzer, Jim; Wilk, Tom (2001). Tales of South Jersey: Profiles and Personalities. Rutgers University Press. ISBN 978-0-8135-3007-9.
