= Metropolitan Club =

Metropolitan Club may refer to:

- Metropolitan Club (New York City), a private social club in Manhattan, New York, United States
- Metropolitan Club (San Francisco), a women's club in San Francisco, California, United States
- Metropolitan Club (Washington, D.C.), a private club in Washington, D.C., United States
- New York Metropolitans, a 19th-century professional baseball team that played in Manhattan, New York, United States

== See also ==
- Metropolitan Golf Club, a golf club in Oakleigh South, Victoria, Australia
- Metropolitan Opera Club, a private supper club in Manhattan, New York, United States
