= Metropolitan Opera Club =

The Metropolitan Opera Club is a private social club within the Metropolitan Opera House in New York City. Founded in 1893 and incorporated in 1899, the club maintains its own dining room (designed by Angelo Donghia and later renovated by Peter Pennoyer) and boxes on the dress circle level of the opera house, and is open to its members for several performances a week during the opera season. Informally known as the "Opera Club", the club is independent of the Metropolitan Opera Association (MOA) (the official name of the Metropolitan Opera).

Founded as a men-only club, the Opera Club has admitted women as full members since 1982.

Members and their guests are required to wear black-tie for evening performances (although white-tie is requested for premieres, galas and certain Monday night performances) and a dark suit or morning dress for Saturday matinee performances. The membership is sometimes affectionately referred to as "the Penguins" because of its attire.

== Early history ==
The club was founded in 1893 when a collection of New York Society gentlemen created a private supper club in a lobby of the old Metropolitan Opera House on West 39th Street/Broadway while the back of the house was under renovation after a fire. Known as the "Vaudeville Club", members and their guests dined and watched performances from a miniature stage designed by Stanford White, a founding member. In its early days, the Vaudeville Club provided a venue for Society (and especially its wives and daughters) to enjoy, without venturing among the general public, illustrious and accomplished music hall performers such as Vesta Victoria, Ward & Volkes, Walter Jones, Mlle Violette, Papinta and her serpentine dances, and pantomimist Pilar-Morin.

By the second year of the Vaudeville Club's existence, the Metropolitan Opera had resumed performances, and the club acquired the use of the large opera box that adjoined the club. Members would thus attend the opera and then enjoy the vaudeville entertainments afterwards. It became apparent over that season, however, that the late night music hall performances were resulting in minor scandal, while the members were increasingly availing themselves of the opera box. By the 1894 season the Vaudeville Club had changed its name to the "Opera Club", and in 1899 its members formally incorporated themselves as the "Metropolitan Opera Club".

== Relationship with artists ==
The club has singers among its membership and often hosts dinners for prominent performers appearing at the Metropolitan Opera. Enrico Caruso wrote the club to thank its members for publicly expressing their support after he was arrested for breach of the peace at the Central Park Zoo in 1906.

== Support for the Metropolitan Opera Association ==
Although the Opera Club is fully independent of the Metropolitan Opera Association, support for the MOA is central to the club's activities. The club donated the gold stage curtain that was made for the opening of the new opera house at Lincoln Center in 1966, and also contributed to its recent replacement. The club continues to make annual gifts to the MOA, which are often used to finance new productions or revivals.

== See also ==
- List of supper clubs
