= Time Supper Club =

- Time Supper Club

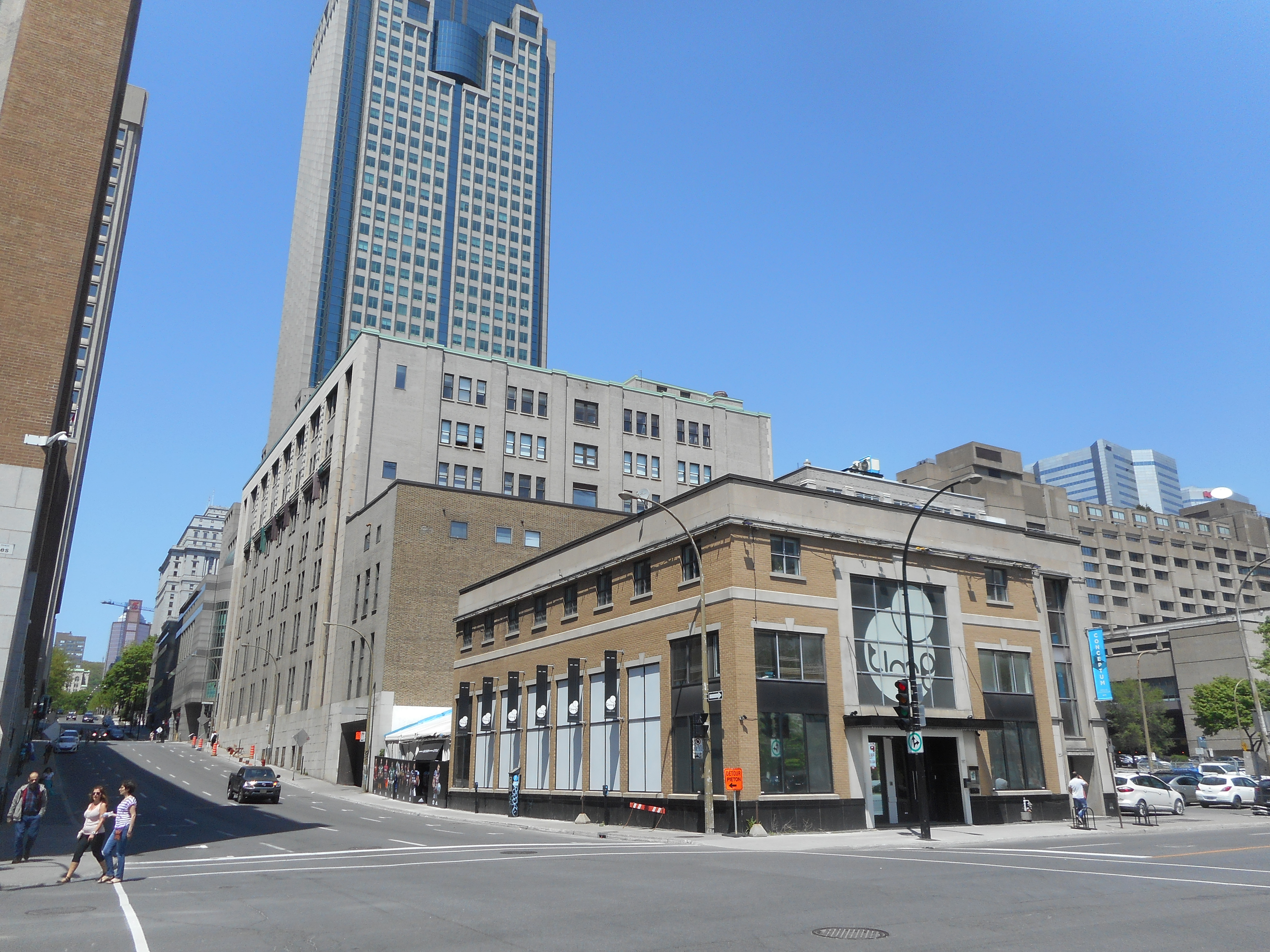
- Rue de la Cathédrale / rue Saint-Jacques
- Interactive map of Time Supper Club
- Address: 997, rue Saint-Jacques; Montreal, Quebec; H3C 1G6
- Coordinates: 45.497187°N 73.564437°W
- Type: Supper club, Nightclub
- Events: R&B; House music

Construction
- Opened: 2002

Website
- www.timesupperclub.com

Time Supper Club is the first supper club in Montreal, Quebec, Canada which mostly featured R&B and house music. The supper club was known for attracting A-list celebrities, world-renowned Dj's and artists, most eventful Grand Prix celebrations, as well as being one of Montreal's hottest weekend hotspots. Located between downtown and the Old Port of Montreal at 997, rue Saint-Jacques, Time Supper Club used to open Friday and Saturday nights as a sit-down dinner and gradually turned into a night club.

== Artists who Performed at Time Supper Club ==
- Snoop Dogg
- Lady Gaga
- Fergie
- Black Eyed Peas
- Drake
- Tiësto
- Avicii
- Edward Maya
- Timbaland
- LMFAO
- T. Mills
- Bob Sinclar
- Wale
- Steve Aoki
- Sean Kingston
- Dada Life
- Kelis
- Trey Songz
- Felix da Housecat
- Vandalism (band)
- Joachim Garraud
- DJ Sasha
- Macy Gray

== See also ==
- List of supper clubs
