= Gus Stevens Seafood Restaurant & Buccaneer Lounge =

- Interactive map of Gus Stevens Seafood Restaurant & Buccaneer Lounge

Restaurant information
- Established: 1946
- Closed: 1975
- Location: US Highway 90, Biloxi, Mississippi, United States
- Coordinates: 30°23′26″N 88°58′51″W

Gus Stevens Seafood Restaurant & Buccaneer Lounge was a restaurant and supper club on US Highway 90 in Biloxi, Mississippi. Gus Stevens, the Greek-American owner, came to the Gulf Coast in 1946.

== History ==
The restaurant building was constructed with a Moroccan architecture style turret.

It was famous in the 1950s and 1960s and hosted many famous entertainers, including Andy Griffith, Mel Torme, Jerry Van Dyke, Martha Raye, Rudy Vallee, Professor Backwards, Mamie Van Doren, Johnny Rivers and Jerry Lee Lewis. It is also well known as the last place where Jayne Mansfield performed; she died early the next morning in a car crash while being driven from the club.

The establishment closed in 1975 and the building was empty until 1977 when it was rented and revamped for an El Palacio Mexican Restaurant. That closed in 1985 and the building was empty until 2000, when it was demolished and the location slated to become a Surf Style store.

== See also ==
- List of seafood restaurants
- List of supper clubs
