= Chez Ami Supper Club =

Supper club and cinema in Buffalo, New York

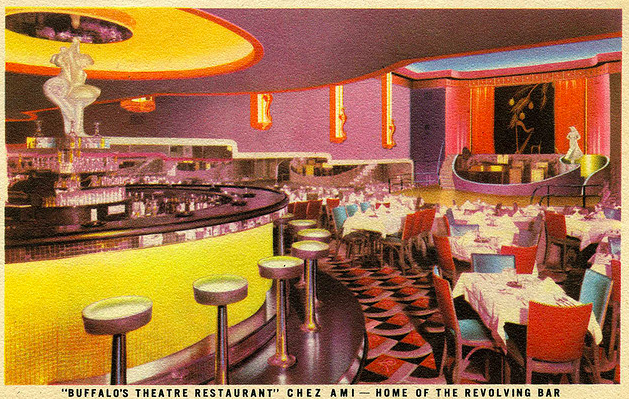
- Chez Ami advertisement from the 1940s
- Location: 311 Delaware Avenue; Buffalo, New York

History
- Built: c. 1934
- Demolished: 1974

The Chez Ami, known as the Chez Ami Supper Club, was located at 311 Delaware Avenue in Buffalo, NY and first opened its door in 1934. It is considered one of the first supper clubs in the nation and had the first rotating bar in the United States. The club was owned and operated by Philip Amigone until his death in 1965. It was subsequently torn down in 1974.

== History ==
The theater was part of an existing structure and shared the building with other businesses. It originally opened as an art house theater named The Little in 1929, and only showed silent films. The Little closed in 1930 and reopened as The Hollywood run by the Basil chain. Basil heavily promoted the theater and showed foreign films, art films, and reruns. The Hollywood closed in 1934. At the time, it was the only movie theater located on Delaware Avenue in Buffalo, one of the city's main thoroughfares. After closing it was refurbished and became the Chez Ami, one of the city's premier nightclubs. The building was eventually razed in 1974.

The interior of Chez Ami was designed by C. Theodore Macheras who used art-deco elements of mirrors, neon, indirect lighting and plush carpeting to achieve a modern entertainment experience. The centerpiece of Chez Ami was a revolving bar, purported to be the first of its kind in America, and- took 7 ½ minutes to make a complete cycle.

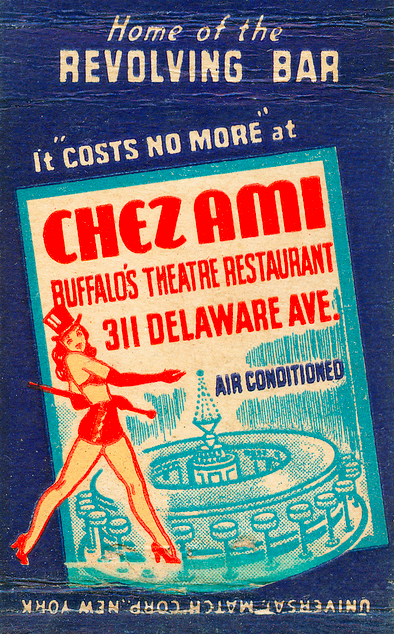
Chez Ami Advertisement

On December 25, 1941, The Chez Ami suffered a fire that destroyed much of its interior. The Chez reopened in the spring of 1942 with the revolving bar repaired, an enlarged dance floor, and expanded balcony seating. Macheras oversaw the rebuild and much of the club's original art-deco décor was retained.

The Chez Ami was remodeled by Amigone with the help of Macheras again in December 1956. The art deco theme was replaced with new Venetian décor including a redecorated façade on the outside and a 15-foot diameter chandelier over the dining area. The revolving bar was also refurbished.

=== Related businesses ===
In addition to Chez Ami, Amigone designed and established the lounge at the Buffalo Memorial Auditorium in 1941 and the restaurant and lounge at Kleinhans Music Hall in 1943 where he was the restaurant concessionaire until 1964.

=== Decline and closure ===
In the early 1960s, in an effort to keep up with changes in consumer preferences, the Chez Ami underwent another transformation into Buffalo's first discotheque. The live stage entertainment and dining were replaced by recorded music and open space for the dance floor. Within months of operating under the new format, the Chez Ami lost its liquor license. On November 23, 1965 a detective claimed that a customer there had solicited him illegally.

In December 1965, Amigone died at the age of 65. After his death, the club was sold to two other owners before it finally closed down in 1971.

== Influence ==
As of 2016, Buffalo developer Mark Croce is currently renovating the Harlow C. Curtiss Building into the Curtiss Hotel. The hotel is anticipated to feature a revolving bar modeled after the revolving bar at the Chez Ami.

== See also ==
- List of supper clubs
