= Carne mechada =

Stewed meat dish

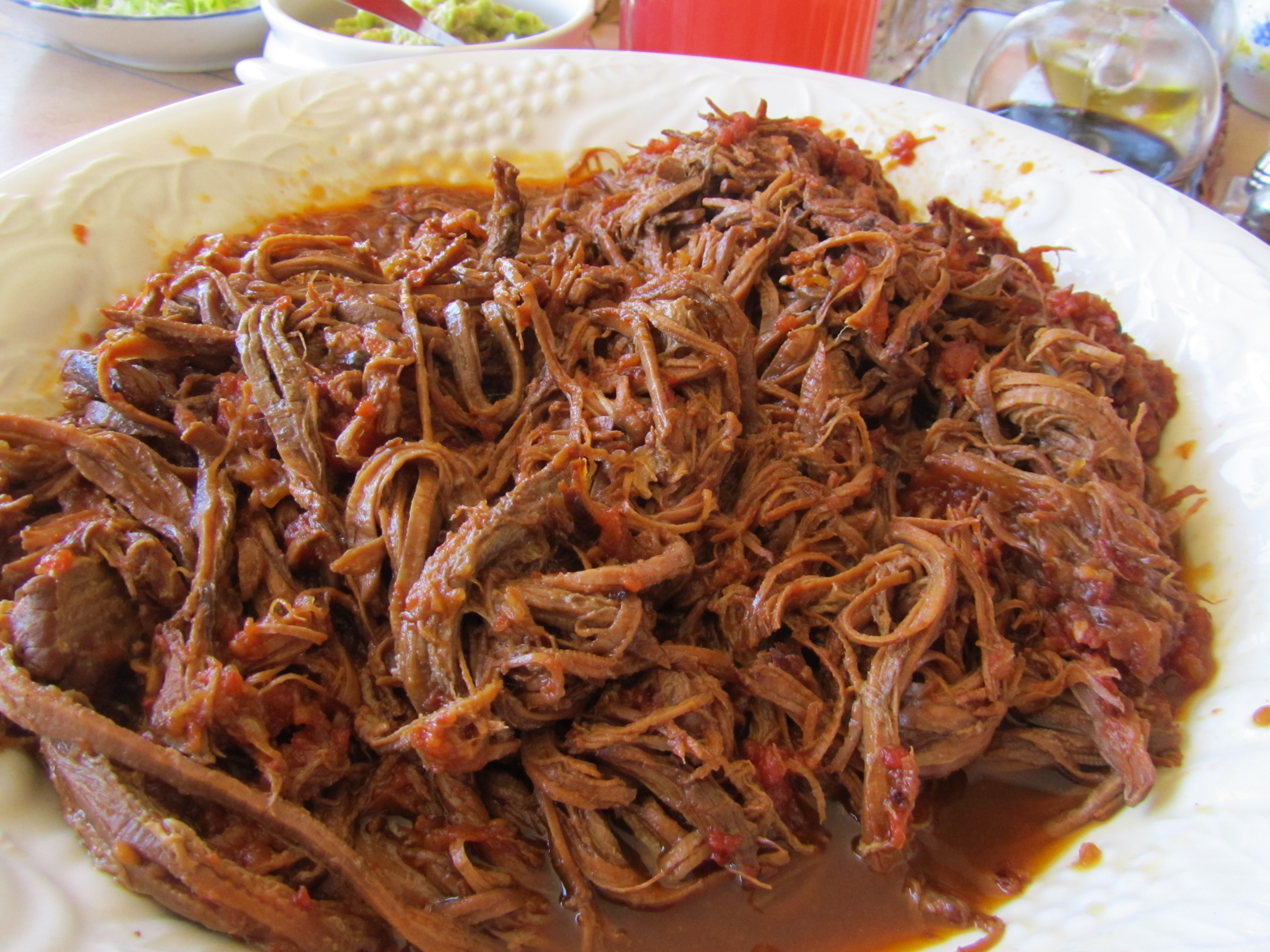
Carne Mechada

Carne mechada is a stewed meat dish traditional of Spanish and Latin American cuisine. It involves slow-cooking or braising a piece of meat, often beef or pork, until it becomes tender and easy to shred.

In Latin America, carne mechada has developed variations and flavors depending on the country and region. In Venezuela and Colombia, carne mechada is made with flank steak or skirt steak that is boiled until tender, then shredded and cooked with onions, sweet red bell peppers, and cumin. In Venezuela it is often served as part of a dish called "pabellón criollo," which includes rice, black beans, and fried plantains. Carne mechada is also used as a filling for arepas, empanadas, or sandwiches.

== Names ==
- Colombia: carne desmechada
- Cuba: ropa vieja
- Dominican Republic: carne ripiada
- Nicaragua: carne desmenuzada
- Venezuela: carne mechada, patas de grillo, pat'e grillo, carne 'esmechá

The name "carne mechada" comes from the Spanish word "mechar," which means "to lard." It refers to the Spanish culinary practice of inserting strips of pork fat into a cut of inexpensive meat to make it more tender and flavorful. Often, the preparation method of carne mechada involves inserting strips of vegetables, such as carrots, celery, bell peppers, and onions, into the meat before cooking.

== Regional variations ==
=== Chile ===
In Chile, carne mechada is made with eye of round roast that is stuffed with carrots, red bell pepper, garlic, and onions and is braised in wine and water. It may be cooked in a pressure cooker. It is then sliced thinly. The meat is served with mashed potatoes or rice and a sauce made from the drippings.

=== Colombia ===
In Colombia, the dish is known as "carne desmechada" and is often served with rice, fried plantains, or arepas.

=== Cuba, Puerto Rico, and Panama ===
In Cuba, Puerto Rico, and Panama, carne mechada is known as "ropa vieja" ("old clothes"). Its preparation in these countries resembles that of Venezuela and Colombia: a flank steak or brisket that is simmered in a tomato-based sauce with onions, and peppers. It is usually served with yellow or white rice, black beans, and fried plantains.

In Cuba, ropa vieja is well known as a national dish (most often served with rice and black beans), but famously was off the menu of many ordinary Cubans for a time during the Special Period of Cuban history, after the fall of the Soviet Union. While some Cubans improvised, substituting lamb or pork for beef during this time (or made special efforts to find beef to make the dish) the dish became commonly available in Cuba again, starting in 2010 with the advent of independent and legal paladares in 2010. Ropa vieja is especially popular among Cuba's Jewish community. Ropa vieja in Cuba is often served with congri rice and fried plantains.

=== Dominican Republic ===
In Dominican Republic, carne mechada is called "carne ripiada" (shredded beef), while the term carne mechada is used to refer to a cut of beef stuffed with ham and vegetables.

=== Nicaragua ===
In Nicaragua, the dish is called carne desmenuzada, or less commonly ropa vieja. It is made with green bell peppers, onions, garlic, salt, Worcestershire sauce, sugar, and mustard. It is usually served with white rice or alongside gallopinto (national dish of Nicaragua), and fried cheese, fried or boiled plantains.

=== Spain ===
In Spain, the dish is a make-do kind of dish in which a cook would stew leftovers in a sofrito base. Chickpeas are almost always included in the Spanish version of this dish.

In Canary Islands, ropa vieja is served with both garbanzo beans and potatoes. Some versions of the dish in the Canaries include other meats, including chicken and pork.

=== Venezuela ===
In Venezuela, the dish is called "carne mechada" or "carne desmechada". It is a component of what is considered Venezuela's National Dish known as the Pabellón criollo. The dish is also often served as a filling for arepas as well as other dishes, and is commonly prepared using the herb annatto to provide a deeper color.

=== Other regions ===
The dish is popular in Honduras, Puerto Rico, and other parts of Latin America, as well as among immigrant communities in the United States.

In the Philippines, the dish includes fish sauce and is served with jasmine rice.
