= Ropa vieja =

Stewed beef with vegetables dish

Cuban plate of ropa vieja (shredded flank steak in a tomato sauce base), black beans, Rice, Maduros

Ropa vieja (English: /ˈroʊpə viˈeɪhə/, Spanish: [ˈropa ˈβjexa]; lit. 'old clothes') is a dish with regional variations in Spain, Latin America and the Philippines. It normally includes some form of stewed beef and tomatoes with a sofrito base. Originating in Spain, it is known today as one of the national dishes of Cuba. The name ropa vieja probably originates from the fact that it was often prepared using food left over from other meals, although it has been suggested that the name comes from the "tattered appearance" of the meat.

== Origins ==
The dish's origins appear to have first arisen among the Sephardic Jews of the Iberian Peninsula, as a slow-cooked stew that was prepared to be eaten over the course of a traditionally observed Shabbat, a kind of cholent called "handrajos" (similar to the Spanish word "andrajos"). Eventually this dish spread to North Africa and to the Canary Islands.

The dish is believed to have been brought to the Americas by immigrants from the Canary Islands and was first reported to have been cooked in Cuba in 1857, but today is well known as a Cuban national dish.

== Regional variations ==
- Canary Islands - Ropa vieja is served with both garbanzo beans and potatoes. Some versions of the dish in the Canaries include other meats, including chicken and pork.
- Cuba - Ropa vieja is well known as a national dish (most often served with rice and black beans), but famously was off the menu of many ordinary Cubans for a time during the Special Period of Cuban history, after the fall of the Soviet Union. While some Cubans improvised, substituting lamb or pork for beef during this time (or made special efforts to find beef to make the dish) the dish became commonly available in Cuba again, starting in 2010 with the advent of independent and legal paladares in 2010. The paladares are restaurants in tourist zones, frequented by tourists and a few Cubans who can afford it. Unfortunately, most Cubans do not get to eat ropa vieja because they don't eat at paladares but rather cook their meals at home. Ropa vieja is especially popular among Cuba's Jewish community. Ropa vieja in Cuba is often served with Moros y Cristianos (dish), a form of rice and beans, and fried plantains.
- In Nicaragua, the dish is called carne desmenuzada, or less commonly ropa vieja. It is made with green bell peppers, onions, garlic, salt, Worcestershire sauce, and mustard. It is usually served with white rice or alongside gallopinto (national dish of Nicaragua), and fried cheese, fried or boiled plantains.
- In the Philippines, ropa vieja includes fish sauce and is served with jasmine rice.
- Other regions - The dish is popular in Honduras, Puerto Rico, and other parts of Latin America, as well as among immigrant communities in the United States.

== See also ==
- Carne mechada
- List of beef dishes
