= Boardwalk Empire (episode) =

- Boardwalk Empire episode
- Episode no.: Season 1 Episode 1
- Directed by: Martin Scorsese
- Written by: Terence Winter
- Cinematography by: Stuart Dryburgh
- Editing by: Sidney Wolinsky
- Original air date: September 19, 2010
- Running time: 73 minutes

Guest appearances
- Erik Weiner as Agent Sebso; Pearce Bunting as Bill McCoy; Joseph Riccobene as Frankie Yale; John Rue as Mayor Harry Bacharach; Dana Ivey as Mrs. McGarry; Johnnie Mae as Louanne Pratt; Peter McRobbie as Supervisor Elliot; William Hill as Alderman George O'Neill; Victor Verhaeghe as Alderman Damien Fleming; Robert Clohessy as Alderman Jim Neary; Greg Antonacci as Johnny Torrio; Danny Burstein as Lolly Steinmann; Charleigh Parker as Fortune Teller; Frank Crudele as Big Jim Colosimo; Jordan Gelber as Simon; Joe Sikora as Hans Schroeder; Samuel Taylor as Paddy Ryan; Stephen DeRosa as Eddie Cantor; Tracy Middendorf as Babette; Adam Mucci as Deputy Raymond Halloran

Episode chronology
| ← Previous — | Next → "The Ivory Tower" |

"Boardwalk Empire" is the pilot episode of the HBO crime drama of the same name. Written by series creator Terence Winter and directed by Martin Scorsese with a budget of $18 million, the episode introduces the character of Nucky Thompson, played by Steve Buscemi, as the corrupt treasurer of Atlantic City who is involved in gambling and bootlegging in 1920. The show used a large ensemble cast and a specially constructed boardwalk set to re-create the Prohibition and Jazz Era, and was based on Boardwalk Empire: The Birth, High Times, and Corruption of Atlantic City by Nelson Johnson. Filming for the pilot took place at various locations in and around New York City in June 2009. The episode first aired in the United States on September 19, 2010.

David Hinkley of the New York Daily News awarded the episode five stars, saying, "Watching HBO's new 'Boardwalk Empire' is like sitting in your favorite tavern and hearing someone say, 'Drinks are on the house.' Friends, it doesn't get much better." Paige Wiser of the Chicago Sun-Times called it "... an event not to be missed," and praised Buscemi in particular, calling his performance "fascinating." The episode gained a 2.0/5 ratings share among adults aged 18–49 and garnered 4.81 million viewers. This was the highest rated premiere for an HBO series since the pilot of Deadwood in March 2004. Following this successful debut, HBO immediately renewed the series for a second season.

== Plot ==
In January 1920, two masked men ambush a group of bootleggers smuggling Canadian Club whisky from offshore boats into the United States. The scene then cuts to three days prior, as Enoch "Nucky" Thompson, the treasurer of Atlantic County, New Jersey, delivers the keynote address at a Women's Temperance League rally on the eve of Prohibition. Nucky leaves the rally early and promptly heads to Babette's Supper Club, where a raucous gathering of elected officials, including his younger brother, Sheriff Elias "Eli" Thompson, celebrate the onset of Prohibition and the lucrative bootlegging opportunities it will bring. Nucky appoints his driver, World War I veteran Jimmy Darmody, as an assistant to Paddy Ryan, a young ward boss belonging to Nucky's political machine. As midnight strikes and Prohibition officially goes into effect, the partygoers toast the "death" of alcohol. Moody and uncomfortable, Jimmy leaves.

The following morning, Jimmy and his common-law wife, Angela, discuss their future. Angela wants Jimmy to return to his studies at Princeton University, but Jimmy is convinced that his future lies with Nucky. Meanwhile, Nucky meets Margaret Schroeder, a pregnant member of the Temperance League. He declines to employ her alcoholic husband, instead giving her a wad of money and having Jimmy drive her home. That night, Nucky and Jimmy visit Mickey Doyle's funeral parlor, a front for illicitly distilling alcohol. Jimmy strikes Mickey for tricking him into drinking formaldehyde, nearly compromising the operation. Scolded by Nucky, Jimmy demands a better job than working for Ryan and implies that the war has matured him. Nucky at first cajoles Jimmy, but ultimately challenges him to make his own opportunities.

Nucky dines with four major mob figures: Arnold Rothstein and his protege Charles "Lucky" Luciano of New York, and "Big Jim" Colosimo and his right-hand man Johnny Torrio of Chicago. Rothstein and Torrio are eager to buy alcohol from Nucky, but Colosimo declines as he considers it too risky. Rothstein requests some liquor for a friend's wedding and Nucky agrees to sell him his latest shipment, on the condition that Rothstein's own men pick it up. Rothstein asks to defer payment until the following day. As Jimmy waits for Nucky outside, he befriends Colosimo’s driver, Al Capone. The next day, Rothstein, a well-known card sharp, takes Nucky's casino for over $90,000. Nucky is furious, realizing that Rothstein has no intention of paying him for the whiskey. As he leaves, he spots Margaret's husband Hans gambling with the money he had given her earlier; the two men argue and Nucky beats Hans and has him thrown out. That night, the drunken Hans severely beats Margaret, causing her to miscarry.

Jimmy, Capone and an unknown accomplice plot to hijack Rothstein's shipment. The episode returns to the conclusion of the opening robbery, in a montage interspersed with scenes from a comedy routine performed by Eddie Cantor attended by Nucky and his mistress. Capone, startled by a deer, opens fire, resulting in him and Jimmy being forced to kill all four of Rothstein's men. Meanwhile, only three miles away, a team of federal agents raid Mickey's operation. With Eli's help, Nucky deduces that Jimmy had informed on Mickey and therefore must also be involved in the robbery. When confronted, Jimmy admits that he counted on Nucky's forgiveness and again asks for his help with more aggressive criminal enterprises, claiming that violence is all he knows now. Jimmy seals Nucky's complicity by presenting him with a share of the money Capone earned by selling the stolen goods to Torrio, warning Nucky that he can no longer afford to be "half a gangster."

When he learns about Margaret's hospitalization, Nucky has Eli kidnap Hans, who is tied up and taken out to sea. Eli personally beats him to death and throws him overboard. In Chicago, Colosimo prepares to open his restaurant for lunch and is shot in the back of the head by Frankie Yale on Torrio’s orders, which would allow Torrio to take over. Back in Atlantic City, the radio reports that police, having found Hans' body in a fisherman's net, have named him as the key suspect in the murder of Rothstein's men, implying that Nucky will continue to protect Jimmy. The episode ends with Nucky delivering flowers to a recovering and now-widowed Margaret.

== Production ==
=== Development ===
Terence Winter, who had served as executive producer and writer on the HBO series The Sopranos, was hired to adapt the book Boardwalk Empire: The Birth, High Times, and Corruption of Atlantic City on June 4, 2008. Winter had been interested in creating a series set in the 1920s, feeling that it had never properly been explored before. It was for this reason that he decided to focus his adaption of the book on the Prohibition era section. On September 1, 2009, it was announced that Academy Award-winning director Martin Scorsese would direct the pilot. It would be the first time he had directed an episode of television since an episode of Steven Spielberg's Amazing Stories in 1986. The production would be very ambitious, with some even speculating it would be too large scale for television. "I kept thinking 'This is pointless. How can we possibly afford a boardwalk, or an empire?'" says creator Terence Winter. "We can't call it 'Boardwalk Empire' and not see a boardwalk." The production would eventually build a 300-foot-long (91 m) boardwalk in an empty lot in Brooklyn, New York at the cost of five million dollars. Despite a reported budget of up to $50 million, the pilot's final budget came in at $18 million.

On why he chose to return to television, Scorsese said "What's happening the past 9 to 10 years, particularly at HBO, is what we had hoped for in the mid-'60s with films being made for television at first. We'd hoped there would be this kind of freedom and also the ability to create another world and create longform characters and story. That didn't happen in the 1970s, 1980s and in the 1990s I think. And of course... HBO is a trailblazer in this. I've been tempted over the years to be involved with them because of the nature of long-form and their development of character and plot." He went on to praise network HBO by saying, "A number of the episodes, in so many of their series, they're thoughtful, intelligent [and] brilliantly put together... It's a new opportunity for storytelling. It's very different from television of the past."

=== Casting ===
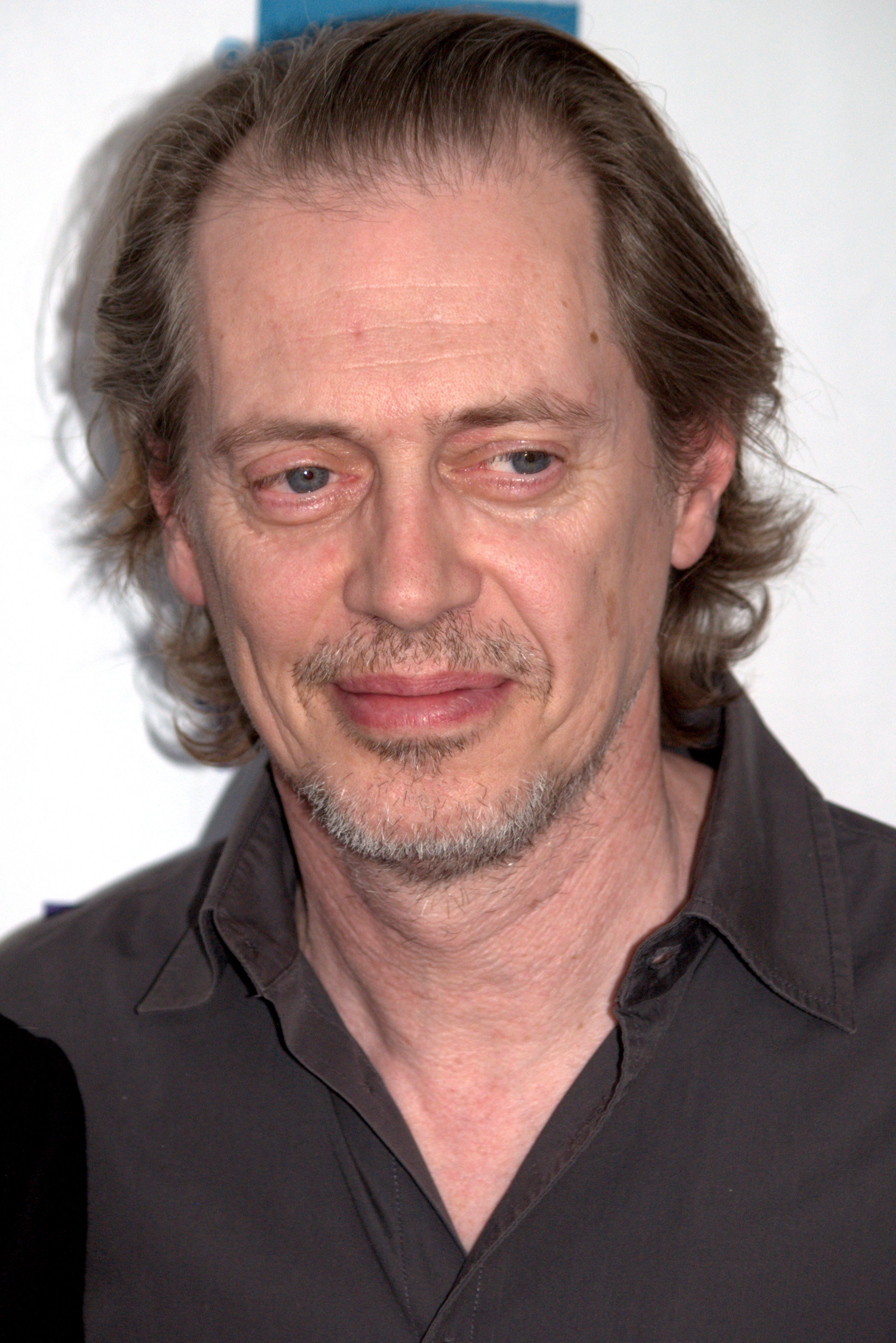
Steve Buscemi plays Enoch "Nucky" Thompson.

"Scorsese is an actor magnet," commented Winter. "Everybody wants to work with him. I had all these pictures on my wall and I thought, 'I'd really better write some good stuff for these people.'" In casting the role of Nucky Thompson (based upon real-life Atlantic City political boss Enoch L. Johnson), Winter wanted to stray from the real life Johnson as much as possible. "If we were going to cast accurately what the real Nucky looked like, we'd have cast Jim Gandolfini." The idea of casting Steve Buscemi in the lead role came about when Scorsese mentioned wanting to work with the actor, whom Winter knew well having worked with him on The Sopranos. Winter sent the script out to Buscemi, who responded very enthusiastically. "I just thought, 'Wow. I'm almost sorry I've read this, because if I don't get it, I'm going to be so sad.' My response was 'Terry, I know you're looking at other actors'... and he said, 'No, no, Steve, I said we want you.'" Explained Scorsese, "I love the range he has, his dramatic sense, but also his sense of humor."

The casting of Buscemi was soon followed by Michael Pitt, best known for his role in the Bernardo Bertolucci film The Dreamers. He was soon joined by Kelly Macdonald, Vincent Piazza and Michael Shannon, who had just received an Oscar nomination for his role in the Sam Mendes film Revolutionary Road.

=== Filming ===
Filming for the pilot took place at various locations in and around New York City in June 2009. In creating the visual effects for the series, the company turned to Brooklyn-based effects company Brainstorm Digital. Says Glenn Allen, visual effects producer for Boardwalk Empire and co-founder of Brainstorm, "It's our most complex job to date. Everything is HD now, so we have to treat it like a feature film." "Any time you get to work on a period piece, it's more fun," comments visual effects artist Chris "Pinkus" Wesselman, who used archival photographs, postcards, and architectural plans to recreate the Atlantic City boardwalks as accurately as possible. "We got to explore what the old Atlantic City was really like. The piers were one of the toughest parts because every summer they would change – new houses, new advertisements." It took two months for the firm to complete all the visual effects for the pilot.

== Reception ==
=== Critical reception ===
The pilot episode received acclaim from television critics. TV Guide's Matt Roush praised the marriage of Scorsese and Winter, saying it "... brilliantly marries Martin Scorsese's virtuosic cinematic eye to Terence Winter's panoramic mastery of rich character and eventful story," and finished his review by stating "It's the most purely—and impurely—enjoyable storytelling HBO has delivered in ages, like a movie that you never want to end." Variety's Brian Lowry praised the show for returning network HBO to top form, saying, "This is, quite simply, television at its finest, occupying a sweet spot that—for all the able competition—still remains unique to HBO: An expensive, explicit, character-driven program, tackling material no broadcast network or movie studio would dare touch... For those wondering when the channel would deliver another franchise to definitively put it on top of the world, Ma, the wait is over: Go directly to 'Boardwalk.'" "One of the unexpected joys of 'Boardwalk Empire,' though, lies in the way the show revels in the oddities of its time, peeling back the layers of polite society to reveal a giddy shadow world of criminals and politicians collaborating to keep the liquor flowing," says online magazine Salon's Heather Havrilesky who went on to call the pilot "breathtaking." Roberto Bianco from USA Today said in his review that Boardwalk Empire was "Extravagantly produced, shockingly violent and as cold and hard as ice, 'Boardwalk Empire' brings us back to the world's former playground at the start of Prohibition—and brings HBO back to the forefront of the TV-series race."

However, not all critical reviews were favorable. Nancy Franklin of The New Yorker felt that the series too closely echoed The Sopranos, and went on to say that "... the first episode alone cost nearly twenty million dollars–and it looks authentic in a way that, paradoxically, seems lifeless. You're constantly aware that you're watching a period piece, albeit one with some vivid scenes and interesting details." Chris Barsanti from PopMatters affords the show six out of ten, remarking that the series "... doesn't begin in the most thought-proving manner..." and added that the character of Jimmy Darmody is a "dud" and Michael Pitt gives "a one-note performance." Aaron Riccio of Slant praised the series overall (awarding it three and a half stars), but commented that the show was "too big" and had too many subplots. "The plots that Boardwalk Empire does settle on are too complex for a single episode," he said, "... while this style of drawn-out, season-long storytelling can work the writers don't establish enough tension up front to carry the back-heavy narrative."

== Accolades ==
| Ceremony | Category | Recipient(s) | Result |
|---|---|---|---|
| 63rd Directors Guild of America Awards | Outstanding Directing for a Drama Series | Martin Scorsese | Won |
| 63rd Primetime Emmy Awards | Outstanding Directing for a Drama Series | Martin Scorsese | Won |
| 63rd Primetime Creative Arts Emmy Awards | Outstanding Art Direction for a Single-Camera Series | Bob Shaw, Douglas Huszti, Debra Schutt | Won |
| 63rd Primetime Creative Arts Emmy Awards | Outstanding Cinematography for a Single-Camera Series | Stuart Dryburgh | Nominated |
| 63rd Primetime Creative Arts Emmy Awards | Outstanding Hairstyling for a Single-Camera Series | Michael Kriston, Jerry DeCarlo | Nominated |
| 63rd Primetime Creative Arts Emmy Awards | Outstanding Make-up for a Single-Camera Series (Non-Prosthetic) | Nicki Ledermann, Evelyn Noraz | Won |
| 63rd Primetime Creative Arts Emmy Awards | Outstanding Single-Camera Picture Editing for a Drama Series | Sidney Wolinsky | Won |
| 63rd Primetime Creative Arts Emmy Awards | Outstanding Sound Editing for a Series | Philip Stockton, Eugene Gearty, Fred Rosenberg, Marissa Littlefield, Steve Visscher, Jennifer Dunnington, Marko Costanzo | Won |
| 63rd Primetime Creative Arts Emmy Awards | Outstanding Sound Mixing for a Comedy or Drama Series (One Hour) | Frank Stettner, Jeff Pullman, Tom Fleishman | Nominated |
| 63rd Primetime Creative Arts Emmy Awards | Outstanding Special Visual Effects for a Series | Robert Stromberg, David Taritero, Justin Ball, Paul Graff, Richard Friedlander, Steve Kirshoff, J. John Corbett, Brian Sales, Ah Dee | Won |

=== Ratings ===
On its original airing at 9 pm, "Boardwalk Empire" gained a 2.0/5 ratings share among adults aged 18–49 and garnered 4.81 million viewers. The episode was re-played twice that night, once at 10:15 pm and again at 11:30 pm Taking these broadcasts into account, a total of 7.1 million Americans viewed the episode on the night of its original broadcast, and is the highest rated premiere for an HBO series since the pilot of Deadwood in March 2004. Following this successful debut, HBO immediately renewed the series for a second season.
