= Surf Style =

US surf-style clothing and souvenir retail chain

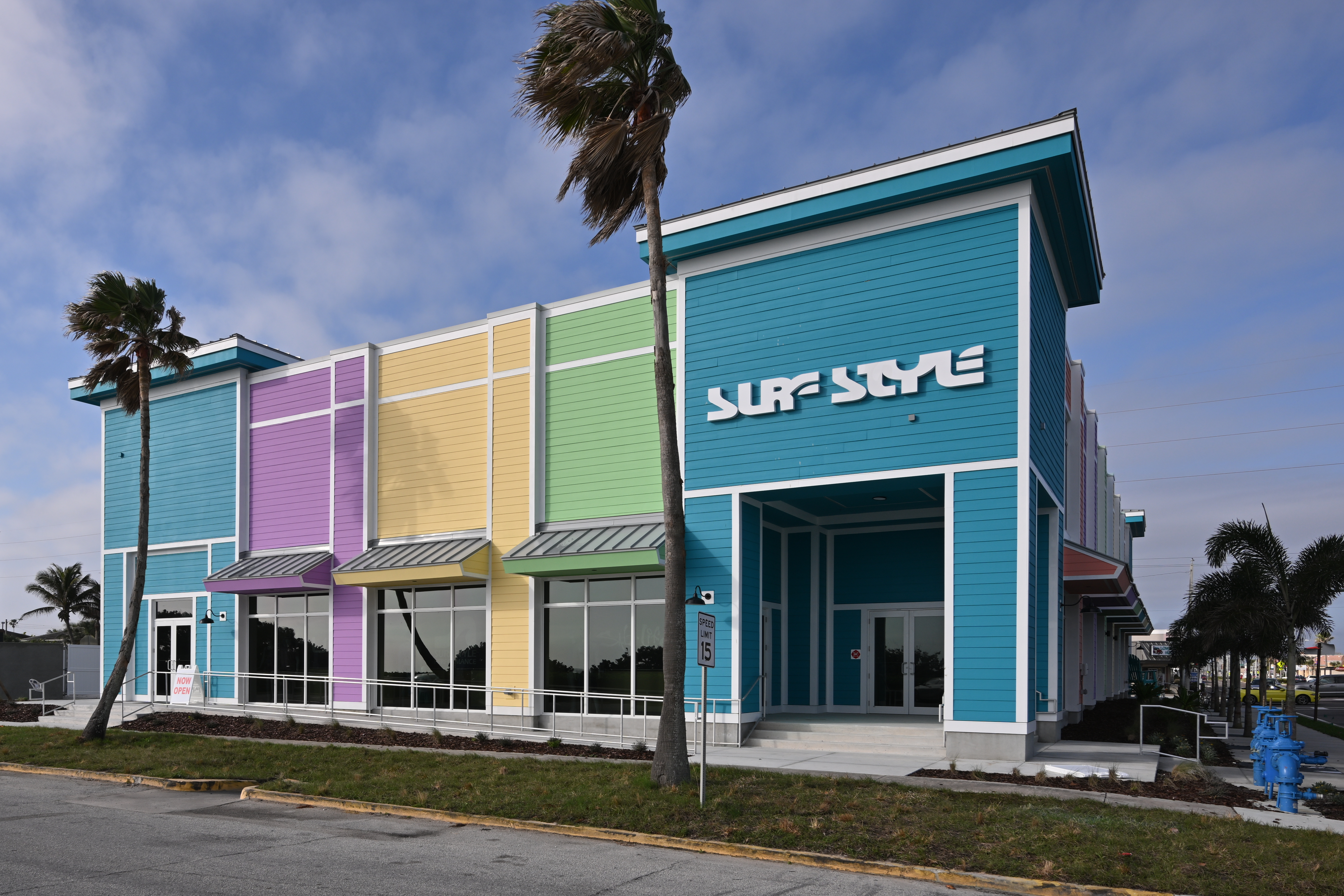
- A Surf Style store
- Industry: Retail
- Founded: 1990; 36 years ago, in Florida, U.S.
- Founders: Eliyahu Levy; Avi Ovaknin
- Headquarters: Hollywood, Florida, United States
- Number of locations: 65 stores
- Area served: Florida, Alabama, and Mississippi
- Key people: Avi Ovaknin (president, CEO); Doron Malinasky (vice president)
- Number of employees: 730
- Website: surfstyle.com
- Footnotes; Financials as of August 19, 2026.

Surf Style is a surf-style clothing and souvenir retail chain in Florida, Alabama, and Mississippi operated by Surf Style Retail Management. Surf Style has about 65 retail locations and is also an internet retailer. Surf Style also carries its own line of branded apparel.

== History ==
Surf Style began with windbreaker sales out of a car trunk. A wholesale clothing business followed and retail stores were eventually developed.

In 2000, the Gus Stevens building at US 90 and Veterans Avenue in Biloxi, Mississippi was slated for conversion into a Surf Style store. The location was a famous nightclub in the 1950s and 1960s and best known as the last place where Jayne Mansfield performed prior to her death. The Platinum Dolls and former stripper turned suburban housewife and murderer, Marjorie Orbin modeled for Surf Style for four years.

A Surf Style store in Gulf Shores, Alabama in 2026

Their flagship store is located in Clearwater Beach, Florida was slated for reconstruction in 2010, including a FlowRider indoor surfing and boogie boarding installation, 31,000 square feet of space, adjoining restaurant space for Britt's Laguna Grill, and 349 space parking garage. A delay was requested due to the BP oil spill. In 2011, Surf Style opened the new $11 million superstore. There was a dispute with the City of Clearwater over outdoor displays at its superstore on Clearwater Beach.

In 2011, Surf Style was sued by Abercrombie & Fitch for trademark infringement over use of a seagull image. In 2013 the company partnered with Guy Harvey.

On Tuesday, March 14, 2023, at the Clearwater Beach location, 20 year old Jonathan Stanley shot and killed 22 year old Rodney Sweeney. Stanley was arrested soon afterwards.

== Offerings ==
The beachwear sold at Surf Style includes sarongs, sunblock, and swimsuits. The indoor FlowRider artificial wave provides an opportunity to learn surfing, a sport difficult to practice on the Gulf of Mexico with its small waves. They sell items including Birkenstock, Crocs, Ray Ban, and others.
