= Harlow C. Curtiss Building =

Historic commercial building in New York, United States

- U.S. National Register of Historic Places
- New York State Register of Historic Places
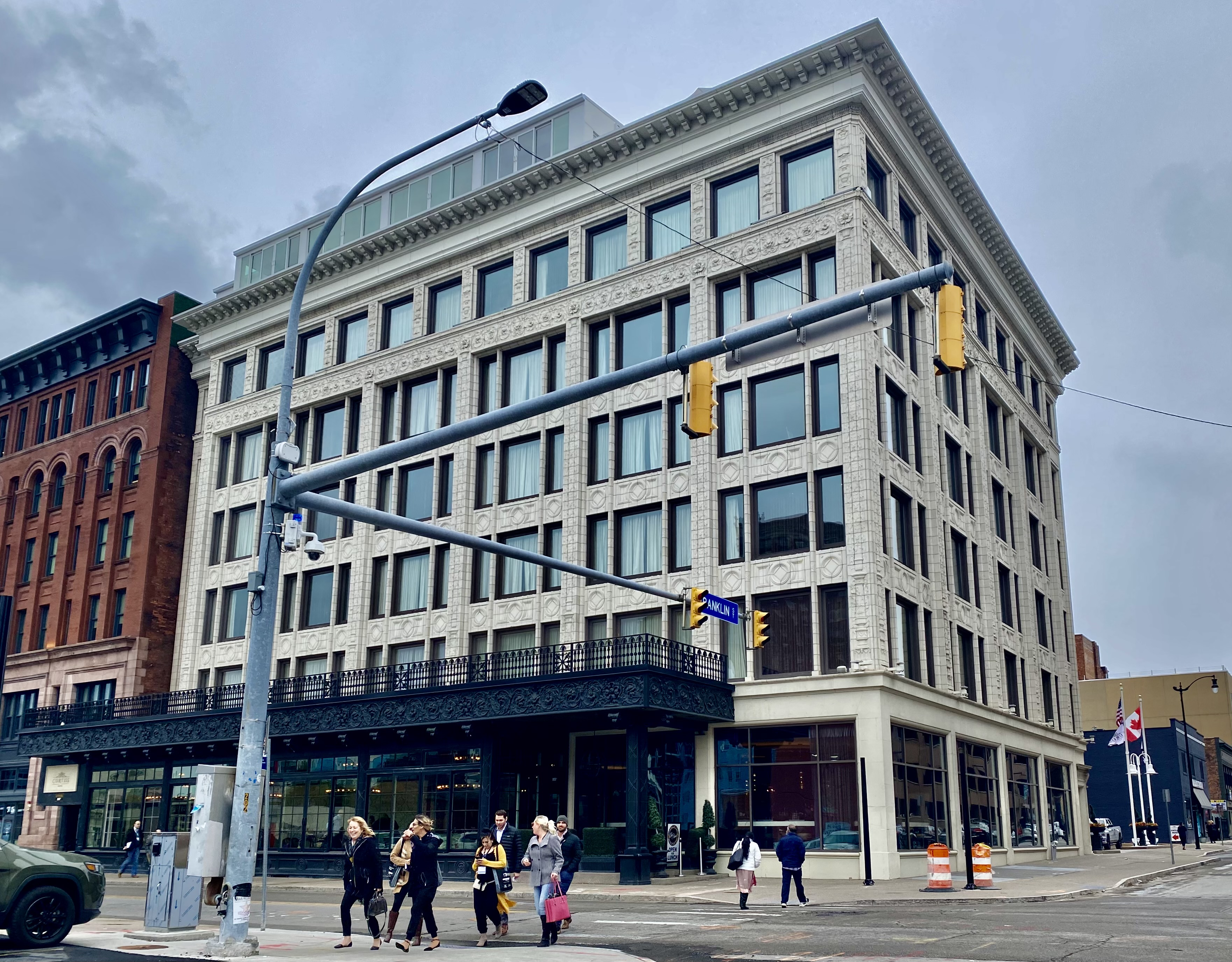
- Harlow C. Curtiss Building, November 2021

- Location within New York Location within the United States
- Location: 204-210 Franklin St., Buffalo, New York
- Coordinates: 42°53′21.47″N 78°52′33.25″W
- Built: 1913
- Architects: Mann, Paul F.; builder: Metz Brothers
- Architectural style: Renaissance Revival, Chicago Commercial
- Website: http://curtisshotel.com/
- NRHP reference No.: 08001142
- NYSRHP No.: 02940.002902

Significant dates
- Added to NRHP: December 5, 2008
- Designated NYSRHP: October 20, 2008

The Harlow C. Curtiss Building, is a historic building located in Buffalo, New York. Originally built for office use, the building was named for its owner Harlow Clarke Curtiss, a prominent Buffalo attorney and real estate investor. The building design resembles elements of the works of renowned Chicago architects such as Daniel Burnham and Louis Sullivan, both of whom also designed buildings in Buffalo.

The Curtiss Building was designed by Buffalo-based architect Paul F. Mann, who was a brother-in-law of Curtiss. The building is one of the largest terra cotta structures of its type and period in downtown Buffalo.

It was listed on the National Register of Historic Places in 2008.

== History ==
Construction on the building began in 1912 and was finished in 1913. The building's earliest tenants included the Kittinger Furniture Company. Other occupants included lawyers, stationers, and paramedical companies, but Curtiss did not have his own office here. The building had a series of successive owners and tenants over the ensuing decades, but was vacant by the early 1990s.

In 2008, the building was listed on the National Register of Historic Places. Developer Mark Croce bought the Curtiss in 2002, and acquired the adjacent former Continental nightclub and a parking lot in April 2009. Croce also owned the Hotel Statler in downtown Buffalo before dying in a helicopter crash in early 2020.

As of June 2017, Croce completed an $18+ million renovation of the building to adapt it as the "Curtiss Hotel". The Curtiss is Buffalo's only 5-star hotel. It has 68 rooms and is open for business. Amenities include a first-floor corner 3-meal restaurant, featuring a revolving bar reminiscent of Buffalo's historic Chez Ami Supper Club. This will have patio seating along W. Huron Street. On the opposite corner of the building, adjacent to a porte cochère and main entranceway, the hotel features Buffalo's first all-weather, urban hot springs/Roman bath.

As of December 2015, project costs were estimated at $20 million because of upgrades. The bar is called "Chez Ami" and makes one full rotation per hour, "at a non-discernible speed," to give patrons a 270-degree panoramic view of the city through giant picture windows.

== 357-363 Delaware Avenue ==
In 1924, Harlow C. Curtiss commissioned a second commercial and office building, to be built at 357-363 Delaware Avenue, and bearing the address as its name. The Buffalo architectural firm of Esenwein & Johnson was the architect selected for that building.

== See also ==
- John Shelton Curtiss, son of Harlow Clarke Curtiss
