= AirDine =

- Available in: English, Spanish, French
- Dissolved: 31 October 2017
- Headquarters: Gothenburg, {{{location_country}}}
- CEO: Charlie Hedström
- Industry: Food & Drink
- Parent: AirDine AB
- Website: www.airdine.com
- Launched: 18 February 2016
- Native clients on: iOS, Android

AirDine was a mobile app within the platform economy where individuals acted as both supplier and customer for a supper club.

AirDine discontinued their service after 31 October 2017.

== Operations ==
AirDine was an online marketplace for home dining that connected users that liked to cook with users looking for a dining experience. Users were categorized as "Hosts" and "Guests," both of whom needed to register with AirDine. AirDine acted as a two-sided market for home dining that allowed hosts and guests, and did not act as a restaurant or host any dinners itself. AirDine charged a service fee. Security and safety of the host were not vetted by AirDine and were completely left to users based on published reviews.

Profiles included user reviews and shared social connections to build trust among users. AirDine also included a private messaging system.
