= Catalina Bar & Grill =

Jazz club and restaurant in Hollywood, Los Angeles, United States

- Interactive map of Catalina Bar & Grill

Restaurant information
- Location: 6725 Sunset Boulevard, Hollywood, Los Angeles, California, United States
- Coordinates: 34°5′54″N 118°20′14″W
- Website: www.catalinajazzclub.com

Catalina Bar & Grill, popularly referred to as Catalina Jazz Club, is a jazz club and restaurant in Hollywood, Los Angeles, California, United States. It regularly hosts live music and according to Los Angeles Magazine hosts the "top names in mainstream and contemporary jazz [who] turn up regularly at this intimate supper club".

== Reviews ==
Jazz for Dummies cites it as one of the prime jazz venues in Los Angeles.

== See also ==
- List of supper clubs
