= Pilar-Morin =

Spanish-French actress (1865–1945)

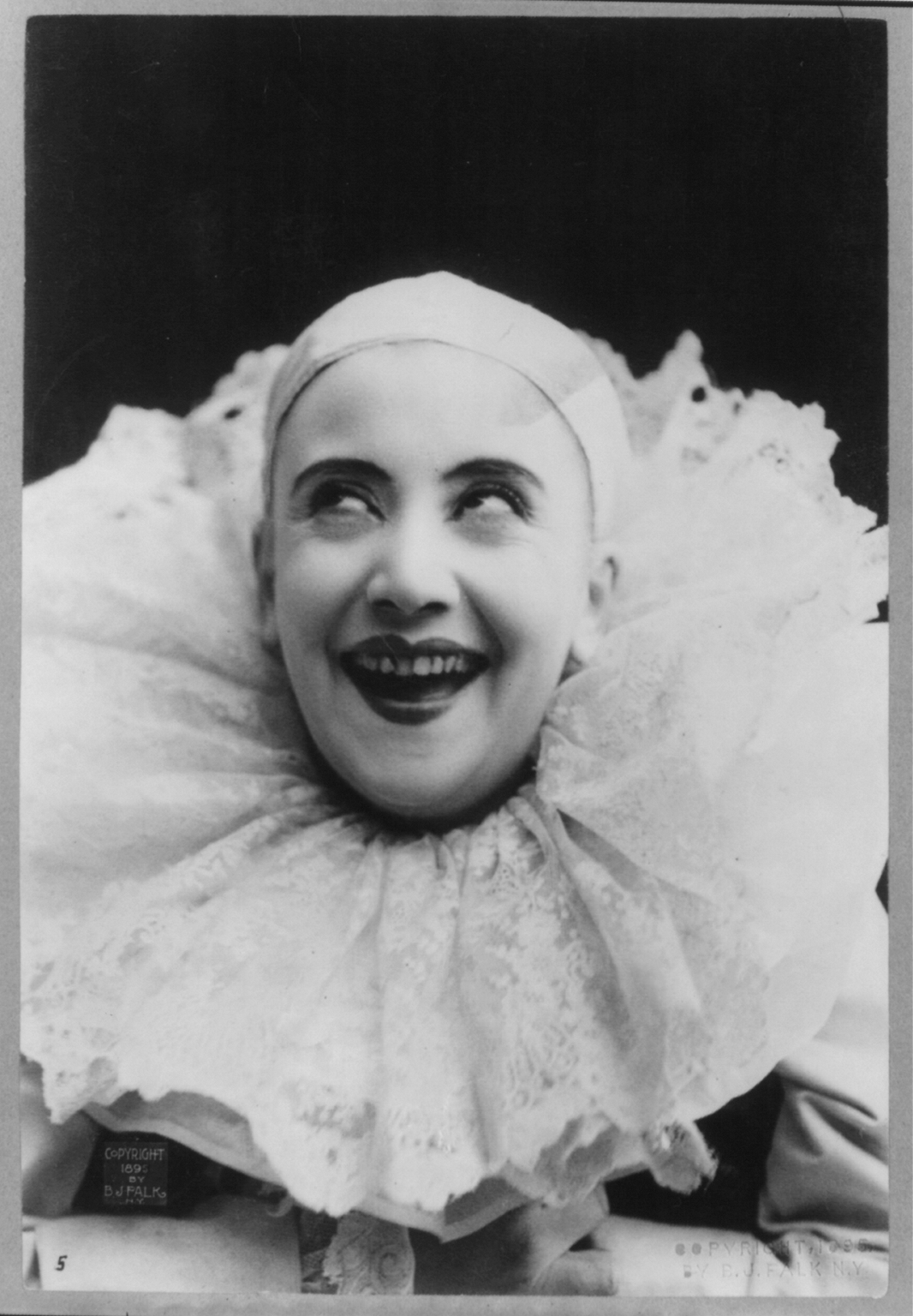
- Pilar-Morin as a Pierrot (1895), from the Library of Congress.
- Born: Pilar de Baradat; March 1, 1865; Barcelona, Spain
- Died: April 28, 1945 (aged 80); Manhattan, New York City, U.S.
- Other names: Pilar Morin, Madame Pilar-Morin
- Occupation: Actress

Madame Pilar-Morin (née Pilar de Baradat; March 1, 1865 – April 28, 1945) was a Spanish-French actress on stage, in vaudeville, and in silent films.

== Early life ==
She was born in 1865 in Barcelona, the daughter of Camella and Adondio De Baradat. Pilar-Morin recalled a childhood in Barcelona, a Catholic education, a brief early marriage to a French count, and training as an actress and singer at the Paris Conservatoire.

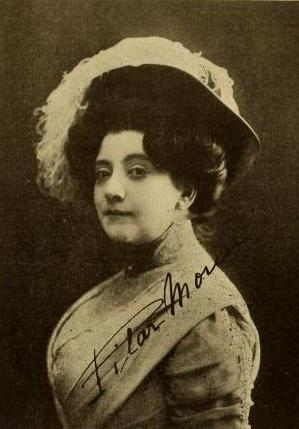
Pilar Morin, from a 1910 publication.

== Career ==
Pilar-Morin was a stage performer who specialized in "silent drama" in the mime tradition, in shows including L'Enfant Prodigue, In Old Japan, A Paris Model, Rachel, and Orange Blossoms. She appeared in David Belasco's Madame Butterfly in London, and in vaudeville in the United States. Her expressive face and gestural vocabulary were considered well-suited to the medium of silent film. "We do not think there is any other woman in the world more suited by training, talent and temperament to the opportunity of uplifting the moving picture by her art."

Edison Company films featuring Pilar-Morin as an actress include Comedy and Tragedy (1909), A Japanese Peach Boy (1910), The Cigarette Maker of Seville (1910, a short, silent version of Carmen), Carminella (1910), The Piece of Lace (1910), From Tyranny to Liberty (1910), The Key of Life (1910), and The Greater Love (1910).

After her film career, Pilar-Morin returned to giving live performances, and had an acting studio in New York. She invented a method, the "Key Note Waved Winged Clavier", for training singers and speakers in breath control. She wrote and presented a short drama about the French Revolution, La Cordette (1913). She also wrote and lectured on drama, breath control, and physical expression, for example in 1919 to the Society of Physical Education in New York. She trained American opera singer Josephine Lucchese in her physical methods.

== Charges of impropriety ==
In 1896, Elizabeth Bartlett Grannis of the National Christian League for the Promotion of Purity charged a theatre manager, J. B. Doris, with "presenting an improper pantomime", specifically Pilar-Morin's Orange Blossoms. Grannis explained that Pilar-Morin's "grimaces" and gestures in a disrobing scene were "suggestive" and "demoralizing." Pilar-Morin appeared before a New York magistrate to defend her show. The case went before the New York State Supreme Court in 1897. Her 1899 show, My Cousin (Ma Cousine) was also condemned as lewd and obscene. "You Americans prate about purity in dramatics," she told an interviewer, "and there ends your opinions on the subject. You do not support pure plays, and naturally drive managers to seek what you really want."

== Personal life ==
Pilar-Morin seldom gave details of her personal life in interviews or lectures. She was married to French pianist and composer Aimé Lachaume (1871–1944) in 1891; he performed with her in Boston in 1893. She testified that she was married and had a son in an 1896 hearing about 'Orange Blossoms'. She and Lachaume divorced in 1908. She was described as being married to "Prince de Matta of Egypt" in 1925, when her terrier, Lalith, wakened the couple and their neighbors to alert them to a fire in their New York apartment building. She was still married to A. Shibley de Matta in 1935.

She died at the age of 80, in 1945, from injuries sustained in a fall from her fourth-floor apartment in W 149 St., Manhattan. Her name was recorded as Pilar Anees Shibley De Matta.
