= McVan's =

- Interactive map of McVan's

Restaurant information
- Established: 1922
- Closed: 1984
- Food type: American
- Location: 2079 Niagara Street, Buffalo, New York, 14207, United States
- Coordinates: 42°56′27.4″N 78°54′19.7″W

McVan’s Nightclub (sometimes referred to as McVAN's Nite Club or McVan’s Rock Palace or Castle) was a supper club and live music venue in Buffalo, New York, located at the corner of Niagara Street and Hertel Avenue. It operated from 1922 until 1984. Over its decades of operation, McVan’s evolved from a supper‐club entertainment venue featuring jazz and blues artists of the day such as Nat King Cole, Ella Fitzgerald, Art Tatum to rock acts such as Jimi Hendrix, and later became a focal point of Buffalo’s original rock, punk, and alternative music scenes.

== History ==
McVan’s was founded in 1922 under proprietor Lillian McVan. Over the mid‑20th century it functioned as a dance and supper club, hosting live entertainment in a more formal style. It hosted the top jazz talents of the day such as Nat King Cole, Ella Fitzgerald, and Art Tatum. Rosita Royce and her doves appeared at the club on January 1, 1945. A March 1946 Billboard article noted that business was booming at the club and that it had begun to develop a reputation for lavish productions. Starting on August 7, 1946, Ella Fitzgerald had a two-week stint at the club. The club also hosted magician and mentalist acts; in June 1949 mentalists Princess Garnell and Professor Hamilton were documented to be performing at the club for four weeks.

On 17 April 1963, former mayor Steven Pankow purchased McVan's. The club gradually shifted toward rock, underground, and original music bookings, from Jimi Hendrix to The B-52s. Lou Gramm and his rock band Black Sheep met Jim Taylor at the club in 1972, who became their promotions manager.

By oral history and local retrospective accounts, owner Joe Terrose was instrumental in transforming McVan’s into a hub for local original music acts. According to The Buffalo News, by the late 1970s Terrose was perhaps the staunchest supporter of local, original artists and bands in town."

McVan’s is often credited as a “bedrock” venue for Buffalo’s “New Wave / original music” era. A number of local bands associated with the Buffalo scene of the late 1970s and early 1980s frequently played McVan’s, including The Enemies, Pauline & the Perils, The Vores, The Jumpers, Pegasus, and Red Thread. McVan’s were often willing to give smaller or emerging local acts a performance venue when more commercial venues would not book them. One documented concert is by the band Parousia on August 9, 1980, at McVan’s.

By the early 1980s, McVan’s began to decline in prominence. According to The Buffalo News, the growth of newer venues (such as The Continental) and shifts in audience habits eroded McVan’s status. In 1985, a segment in WIVB-TV documentary Play It Again Buffalo! featured interviews with entertainers from the 1940s‑1950s including Tony Ode, who was the master of ceremonies at McVan’s, and Lenny Paige, who was MC at the club.

After closure in 1984, the building was later demolished and replaced by a Wilson Farms convenience store at the same corner. In 2024, the McVAN’S Song Project was launched to preserve and repurpose original music from the McVan’s era (1975–1989) and to raise funds for a historical marker at the former site of the club (corner of Niagara & Hertel).

== Architecture and interior ==
Contemporary descriptions suggest the interior in its rock era was modest and unglamorous, with a small stage, textured walls, basic lighting, and a "musty" feel typical of grassroots club venues.
