= ChoyChoy =

Restaurant in Tokyo, Japan

ChoyChoy is a restaurant serving Hong Kong cuisine.

ChoyChoy was founded in 2011 by Grace Choy in Yuen Long, Hong Kong.

ChoyChoy relocated to Meguro-ku, Tokyo, in 2020.
