= Charlie's Burgers =

Series of dining events in Toronto, Canada

Charlie's Burgers is a series of private dining events originated in Toronto, Ontario, Canada in 2009 operated by Franco Stalteri and Donato Carozza. In 2010, it was ranked by Food and Wine Magazine as one of the top three "word of mouth" supper clubs on its list of "100 Best New Food and Drink Experiences in the World". Each dinner event is hosted by a different high-profile chef and is held in a different location, with the location being secret until the last minute. Charlie's Burgers has collaborated with chefs recognized by The World's 50 Best Restaurants, The Michelin Guide and Relais & Chateaux, in Canada, England and France. In January 2010 it held a dinner event featuring insects for which guests paid $155. In July 2010 it expanded beyond Toronto to offer events in London and Paris. In August 2011, Charlie's Burgers launched its own Champagne, a Grand Cru, Blanc de Blancs from a grower from Oger, Marne, France. Franco is a voter on the world’s 50 Best Restaurant List.

== TV appearances ==
Franco Stalteri, (Charlie's Burgers Co-founder) was a guest judge on Top Chef Canada, season two episode 11, alongside Lidia Bastianich. Franco was also a guest judge on 2 seasons of Iron Chef Canada.

The restaurant was featured in the first-season finale of the reality television series The Illegal Eater.
