= Ghetto Gourmet =

Oakland dining experience

The Ghetto Gourmet was an underground dining experience in Oakland, California that ran from 2003 to 2008. Diners paid between $40 and $100 and were served a table d'hôte meal prepared by a professional chef at a non-restaurant location. Local restaurant chefs cooked on their days off. Douglas Adesko at Time magazine wrote: "Jeremy Townsend, the original Ghetto Gourmet, came up with the idea when his brother, a line cook, wanted to try some dishes. They started in their house in Oakland, California. Two years and one visit from a health inspector later, Townsend took his idea mobile, trying out chefs in other cities. 'My ultimate dream is to tour the country like a rock band, except with dinner parties,' he says."

In addition to Time, The Ghetto Gourmet has been featured in the San Francisco Chronicle, The Wall Street Journal, the Los Angeles Times, and Marketplace.
