= Susanna Grannis =

American academic

Susanna W. Grannis (born 1937) is a retired American academic, and the founder of CHABHA (Children Affected by HIV/AIDS), a nonprofit organization that supported orphans and vulnerable children in Rwanda, Burundi, and South Africa from 2004 to 2014. She was professor and dean at the University of Illinois Chicago, Queens College, and at the Bank Street College of Education. She is the author of Hope Amidst Despair: HIV/AIDS-Affected Children in Sub-Saharan Africa (Pluto, 2011) and two self-published children's books. Writing as Susanna W. Pflaum, she is the author of books and academic papers about teaching and education, with a particular focus on advancing academic opportunity for disadvantaged students. She lives in Stuyvesant Falls, New York.

== Education ==
Grannis graduated cum laude in 1959 from Radcliffe College (now part of Harvard University) in Cambridge, Massachusetts, before getting her master's degree in elementary education at Harvard Graduate School of Education the following year. From 1960 to 1963, Grannis worked as an elementary school teacher at Newton Public Schools in Newton, Massachusetts.

From 1963 to 1966, Grannis worked as a grade 6 teacher at the laboratory school of the Inter-American University in San Germán and later as instructor at the Inter-American University branch Hato Rey, Puerto Rico. Two years later, she moved to Tallahassee, Florida, where she worked as a graduate instructor and earned her Ph.D. in elementary education from Florida State University. In 1970-1971 she also worked as an instructor at Mankato State College (now Minnesota State University) in Mankato, Minnesota.

== Academic career ==
After attaining her Ph.D. in 1971, Grannis accepted a teaching position at the University of Illinois Chicago College of Education where she worked for fourteen years, becoming the Founding Dean of UIC's Honors College in 1982.

In 1985, Grannis left Chicago to become the Dean at the School of Education at Queens College, City University of New York. During this time she was also a professor at Queens College's Department of Education and Community Programs. After five years at QC, Grannis became the dean at the graduate school of the Bank Street College of Education in Manhattan, and held that position until 1995.

In 1996, Grannis was a Fulbright Professor at the University of Namibia in Windhoek, Namibia. The following year she joined the adjunct faculty of the adult degree program at Norwich University in Northfield, Vermont.

== CHABHA ==
In 2003, Grannis left Norwich University and founded the 501(c)(3) nonprofit organization CHABHA, Children Affected by HIV/AIDS, where she served as executive director until 2010. She opened a CHABHA office in Kigali, Rwanda, and as well as a vocational school. CHABHA supported over two thousand children in Burundi, Rwanda, and South Africa, coordinating with local children's associations and training young adults orphaned by AIDS as leaders at community-based programs.

== Publications ==
=== Books ===
- Pflaum, S.W. (Ed.) (1978). Aspects of Reading Education. National Society for the Study of Education. Berkeley: McCutchan Publishing.
- Pflaum, S.W. (1986). The Development of Language and Literacy in Young Children. Third edition. Columbus: Charles E. Merrill. Second edition, 1978. First edition, 1974.
- Pflaum, S. W. (Ed.) (1992). Health Education: Health Educators and Teacher Educators Collaborate. Bank Street College. (Funded by grant from New York State Department of Education)
- Pignatelli, F. & Pflaum, S.W. (Eds.) (1991). Thought and Practice: The Journal of the Graduate School of Bank Street College of Education. New York: Bank Street College.
- Pignatelli, F. & Pflaum, S.W. (Eds.) (1993). Celebrating Diverse Voices: Progressive Education and Equity. Newbury Park, CA: Corwin Press.
- Pignatelli, F. & Pflaum, S.W. (Eds.) (1994). Experiencing Diversity: Toward Educational Equity. Newbury Park, CA: Corwin Press.
- Bishop, P. A. & Pflaum, S. W. (2005). Reading and Teaching Middle School Learners: Asking Students to Show What Works. Newbury Park, CA: Corwin Press.
- Grannis, S. W. (2011). Hope Amidst Despair: HIV/AIDS-Affected Children of Africa. London: Pluto Press. (Distributed in the US by Palgrave Macmillan)
- Grannis, Susanna (2013). A Bovine Memoir. Self-published.
- Grannis, Susanna (2015). I Was Naughty, Too, Some of the Time. Self-published.

=== Papers ===
Grannis led and participated in research concerning children's reading difficulties and published many papers in educational research journals. Of these, the paper she co-authored with E.T. Pascarella, "Interactive effects of prior reading achievement and training in context on the reading of learning disabled children" (Reading Research Quarterly, 1980), was the recipient of the Albert J. Harris Research Award for Outstanding Research on Reading Disabilities, International Reading Association (now the International Literacy Association), 1981.

As well, she wrote papers on her research on children's sense of control and their reading behaviors, such as "The interaction of children's attribution and level of control over error correction in reading instruction," by Grannis and Esther T. Pascarella (Journal of Education Psychology, 1980), and "Student perceptions of reading engagement: Learning from the learners," by Grannis and Penny A. Bishop (Journal of Adolescent and Adult Literacy, 2004).

Grannis also wrote papers about diversity issues in teacher education, like "Diversity in education: Implications for teacher preparation" with Anne Francis-Okongwu, in Grannis' publication with Frank Pignatelli, Celebrating Diverse Voices: Progressive Education and Equity (Corwin Press, 1993).
