= Elizabeth Bartlett Grannis =

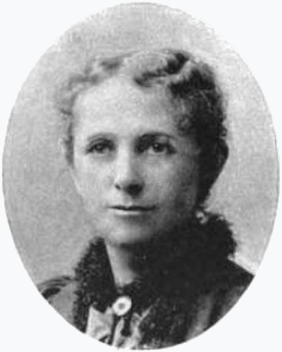
- Elizabeth Bartlett Grannis, from an 1894 publication.
- Born: Elizabeth Bartlett; March 27, 1840; Hartford, Connecticut
- Died: March 22, 1926 (aged 85)
- Education: Lake Erie Female Seminary
- Occupations: Editor, Publisher, Suffragist
- Spouse: Frederick Winslow Grannis (m. 1865) ending in divorce

Elizabeth Bartlett Grannis (March 27, 1840 — March 22, 1926) was an American editor, publisher, suffragist, "disturber of the peace", and eugenics and dress reform advocate.

== Early life ==
Elizabeth Bartlett was born in Hartford, Connecticut, the daughter of Edward Phelps Bartlett and Maria Melinda Howard Bartlett. In 1850 she moved with her widowed mother to Orwell, Ohio, where she attended high school and later Lake Erie Female Seminary from 1859 to 1862. Elizabeth Bartlett taught school and Sunday School in Ohio as a teenager.

== Activities ==
=== Editing and Publishing ===
In 1873 Grannis bought The Church Union, a national church weekly newspaper, and was its editor and publisher for more than twenty years. Through that work, she became close friends with newspaper contributor Rev. Joseph Ruggles Wilson, a theology professor and the father of Woodrow Wilson. She published the poetry of William Cullen Bryant in her newspaper, along with her personal endorsements in presidential elections. She also edited The Children's Friend and Kindergarten Magazine for seven years.

=== National Christian League for the Promotion of Purity ===
Grannis founded the National Christian League for the Promotion of Purity from 1887, and was its longtime president. Part of the League's work was an emphasis on "the same standard for social purity for boys and men as ought to be maintained for women and girls." For example, the League worked for protections for women prisoners, who were otherwise preyed upon by male guards and other officials. She was also anti-tobacco, and worked for New York State laws against tobacco sales to minors and against smoking in prisons. The League promoted married women's economic independence and laws requiring child support from absent fathers, as measures likely to improve public and private morality. She opened and funded a home for working women, the National Christian League Home for the Benefit of Self-Supporting Women, in 1895. She was also an advocate of eugenic sterilization, backing a law allowing the procedure in cases of "promiscuous propagation of imbecility and criminality." She traveled often in her work for the League, on lecture tours and attending international conferences. In 1893, she spoke at the World's Conference of Representative Women, held in conjunction with the Chicago Columbian Exposition that year.

=== Dress reform and lunacy laws ===
Grannis also focused her energies within New York City, attacking the gowns worn by audiences to the Metropolitan Opera as being too revealing; visiting music halls with her brother to see the immoral aspects of the popular shows for herself. Her dress reform advocacy included campaigning against corsets, and fashioning her own "rainy day costume", with shorter skirts to avoid puddles.

She was first vice president of the Society for the Benefit of the Insane. Late in 1925, in the last months of her life, she described her work to free married women from lunatic asylums, where they had been committed by an unhappy spouse with minimal medical advice. "The lunacy laws are not alike in all states," she explained, "but there is hardly a decent law anywhere."

=== Church ===
Grannis was a member of the First Church Disciples of Christ in New York City, until her membership was dismissed (but she was allowed to continue regular attendance and sacraments) in 1906, for her being "a disturber of the peace." Her specific offending acts were that she brought her adopted, African-American daughter Christian League Woodyear to church, and she called out the church's pastor, Benjamin Q. Denham, for sexual improprieties. Miss Woodyear later attended Tuskegee Institute.

=== Voting rights ===
Grannis annually attempted to register to vote, marching to the polls and declaring herself a "Female Man," with "man" used in the general sense of a human being; her efforts were rebuffed. Sometimes she filled out a ballot anyway, and handed it to a male friend or her brother, who submitted it for her. She worked at the polls as a watcher from as early as 1888. She voted legally for the first time in 1918, after many years of suffrage activism. She was 80 years old at the time, and went to the polls using a wheelchair. "I have waited long for this day, and I pray that every woman in the land may soon have the same privilege," she declared after voting.

== Personal life and legacy ==
Elizabeth Bartlett married Frederick Winslow Grannis in 1865; she was his second wife. After they divorced, she was close to Joseph R. Wilson, sharing meals and living space with him until 1894, though Woodrow Wilson described his father's friend as being "about as undesirable a companion as one could find in the ranks of chaste women". She died at home in 1926, just before her 86th birthday, and her remains were buried at Hartford.

In 2012, her church membership was posthumously restored by Park Avenue Christian Church, and an award for women in the church community was named in her memory.
