= Underground restaurant =

Restaurant operating out of a residence

An underground restaurant, sometimes known as a supper club or closed door restaurant, is a social dining restaurant operated out of someone's home, generally bypassing local zoning and health-code regulations. They are usually advertised by word of mouth or unwanted advertising. Websites such as BonAppetour have been created to help people find and book these restaurants.

Depending on the area's law, the establishments may be illegal, even though they have been around for decades. They are becoming increasingly popular in the U.S., and in Cape Town and the Netherlands, where they are known as 'huiskamer restaurants' ('living room restaurants').

== Appeal ==
The attraction of the underground restaurant for the customer varies. In some cases, it is the opportunity to sample new food, often at low cost outside the traditional restaurant experience; other times, customers are paying a premium price for direct access to some of the top chefs and young talent in a region. Guests of the underground restaurant also cite one of the biggest reasons for enjoying the experience is the social interaction with strangers over food, something which would generally be frowned upon in a traditional restaurant setting. "Every dinner you go to is completely different", one avid supporter of pop-up restaurants told Cape Town magazine.

Underground restaurants have been described as "anti-restaurants"; though an increasing number of restaurant chefs are stepping out of their kitchens to re-ignite their passion for cooking in non-traditional spaces. For the host, the benefit is to make money and experiment with cooking without being required to invest in restaurant property. "It's literally like playing restaurant", one host told the San Francisco Chronicle. "You can create the event, and then it's over".

== History ==
In 2013 a new kind of underground restaurant emerged in Cape Town, South Africa, called SecretEATS. Unlike social dining restaurants of the past, the concept brings together top South African chefs, international guest chefs, or young, rising stars with adventurous food and wine lovers in secret, undisclosed locations. Guests request a private invitation to join the members-only dining movement through the web site; invitations are sent based on factors such as interests, geography and special dietary requirements like vegetarians.

== Notable places ==
=== Canada ===
- Charlie's Burgers - Toronto

=== United States ===
- Ghetto Gourmet

== See also ==
- Speakeasy
- Smokeasy
- Guerrilla Gourmet
