= Zoe Crosher =

American artist and enthusiast

Zoe Crosher FRSA
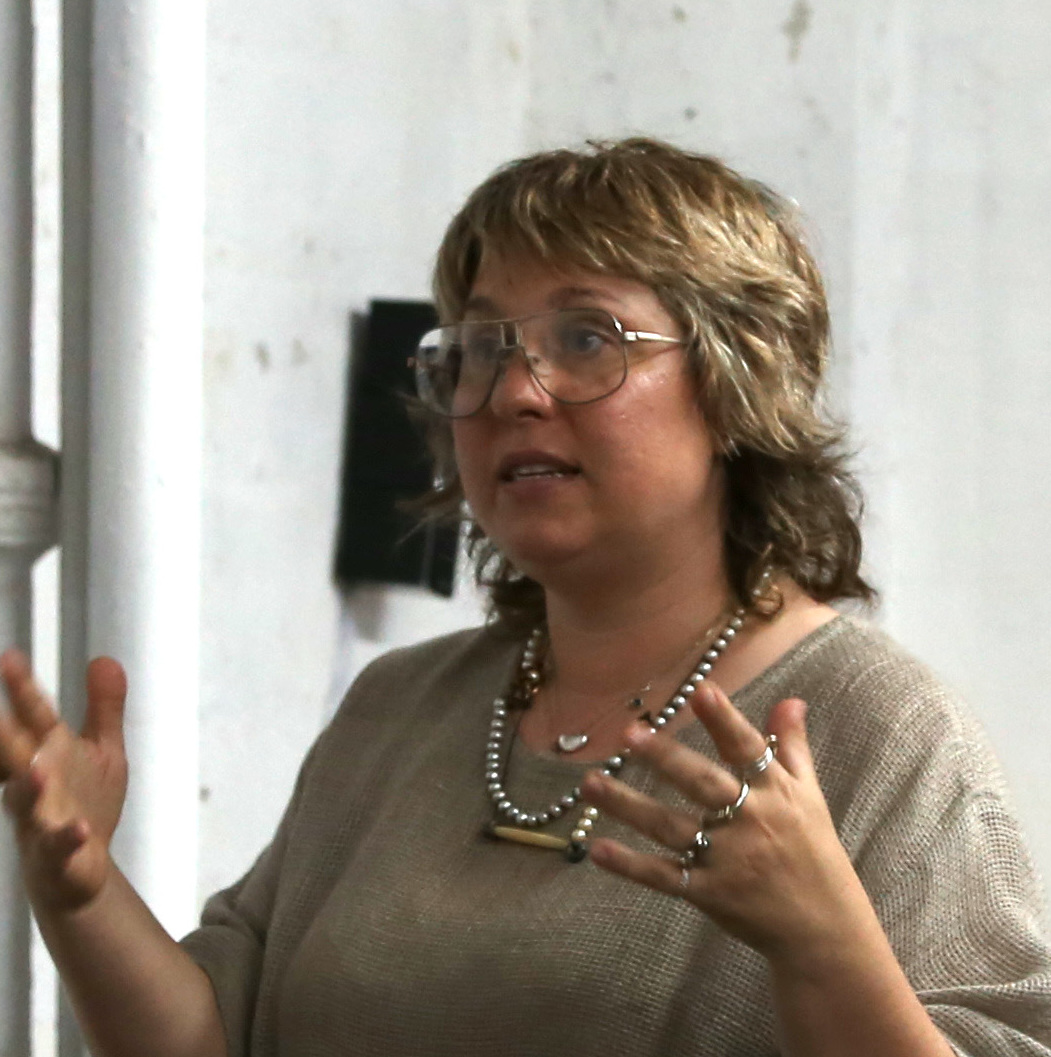
- Born: 1975 (age 50–51); Santa Rosa, California
- Education: University of California, Santa Cruz; California Institute of the Arts
- Website: Official artist website

Zoe Crosher (born July, 1975) is an American artist and enthusiast whose work has been exhibited widely at institutions such as the Aspen Art Museum, LACMA, MoMA, and the California Museum of Photography. Crosher lives and works in Los Angeles, CA.

== Biography ==
Crosher was born in Santa Rosa, CA. The daughter of a diplomat and airline stewardess, Crosher grew up mostly as an expatriate. She attended the University of California, Santa Cruz, and the California Institute of the Arts (CalArts).

Named a “prominent Los Angeles artist” by the New York Times, Crosher's work is included in various international, private and museum collections including The Los Angeles County Museum of Art, The Museum of Modern Art, The San Francisco Museum of Modern Art, and The Palm Springs Museum. She is the founder and president of the Los Angeles branch of The Fainting Club and a fellow at the Royal Society of the Arts in London. She has taught at University of California, Los Angeles (UCLA) and Art Center College of Design, Pasadena, CA.

== Early career ==
Crosher edited NTNTNT (2004), a collaborative project that investigated the short-lived history of net.art, and later served as associate editor of Afterall Magazine. In 2006, she was the recipient of the Penny McCall Foundation Publishing Award (New York, NY) and the Pillowfight Grant (Seattle, WA). She is also a 2007 recipient of the Materials & Applications residency in Los Angeles, CA.

== Mid-career to present ==
In 2011 Crosher received the Los Angeles County Museum of Art AHAN Award (Art Here and Now) The same year, Aperture published the first of a series of a limited edition, four volume set of books that offers Crosher's re-interpretation of Michelle duBois' (a frequent protagonist in Crosher's work) archive of self-portraits titled "The Reconsidered Archive of Michelle duBois." In 2012, Crosher's work was included in MoMA's 2012 New Photography exhibition.

In collaboration with Los Angeles Nomadic Division, Crosher initiated and co-curated The Manifest Destiny Billboard Project, a public art exhibition taking place on billboards along the I-10 freeway. Crosher's work closed the show, appearing in 2015 on the westernmost segment of the project. Together with LAND, she is a 2013 co-recipient of the Robert Rauschenberg Foundation “Artistic Innovation and Collaboration Award” and the 2015 Smithsonian Ingenuity of the Year Award with Shamim M. Momim.

Numerous books have been published on her work, including one recently released in February 2016 (and sold out) by Hesse Press.

In 2015, Crosher was the recipient of Smithsonian Magazine's American Ingenuity Award for Visual Arts.

In 2018, Crosher's ongoing series "LA Like: Prospecting Palm Fronds" was exhibited at the Aspen Art Museum.
