= Paladar =

In Cuba a Paladar (plural: paladares) is a small, family-run restaurant. The name comes from a Spanish word for "palate." Paladares serve as a counterpart to state-run restaurants for tourists seeking a more vivid interaction with Cuban reality, and looking for homemade Cuban food.

== Origin of the name ==
The term in popular usage has its origin in the Brazilian soap opera Vale Tudo, shown in Cuba in the early 1990s. Paladar (Portuguese and Spanish for "palate") was the name of the chain of restaurants run by Rachel Accioli, the protagonist, played by Regina Duarte. The broadcast of that soap opera coincided in time with the first issue of licenses for self-employers's work in Cuba, so Cuban popular culture designated the then-new type establishments by this name.

== History ==
Privately owned small restaurants have always existed in Cuba. Until the 1990s they were illegal, but the fall of the USSR and consequent economic crisis in Cuba forced the government to make the economic reforms of 1993. One of the items in those reforms was the legalization of privately owned small businesses as restaurants.

Since its inception in the late 1990s, the paladares were subjected to limitations by the Cuban government concerning the amount and type of products they could offer, the hiring of labor force and the number of seats they could have. The process of renewal of the economic model started in 2010 led to a review of these measures, resulting in a substantial increase in the number of paladares and the diversification of their proposals.

The models that emerge are quite diverse, ranging from the typical business set up in a family home, up to more elaborated variations including different types of cuisine in rooms specially designed or modified for the activity. Similarly, while most retailers offer Cuban food, and Italian food, which is very popular in Cuba, others have produced more ambitious projects combining local cuisine with Mediterranean and international elements.

The composition of the staff has also changed, moving from a model in which they were composed mainly of people united by family ties with a low level of professional training to teams that integrate professional chefs, often with long experience in gastronomy with other specialties such as marketing, accounting, public relations, legal advice and more.

== Cultural references ==
The Academy Award nominated Cuban film Strawberry and Chocolate, based on Cuban writer Senel Paz's short story "The Wolf, the Forest and the New Man", used a house en Havana's neighborhood Centro Habana as a stage for La Guarida del Diego (Diego's Den), home of one of the main characters. A few years after filming, this place became "La Guarida", one of the most reputed paladares in the city.

Cuban reggaeton group Gente de Zona, used Vedado's paladar La Pachanga to film a video clip for their popular song "Salte del sartén" ("Get Yourself out of the Frying Pan").

== See also ==
- Underground restaurant, similar places in other countries.
