= Supper club =

Type of dining establishment

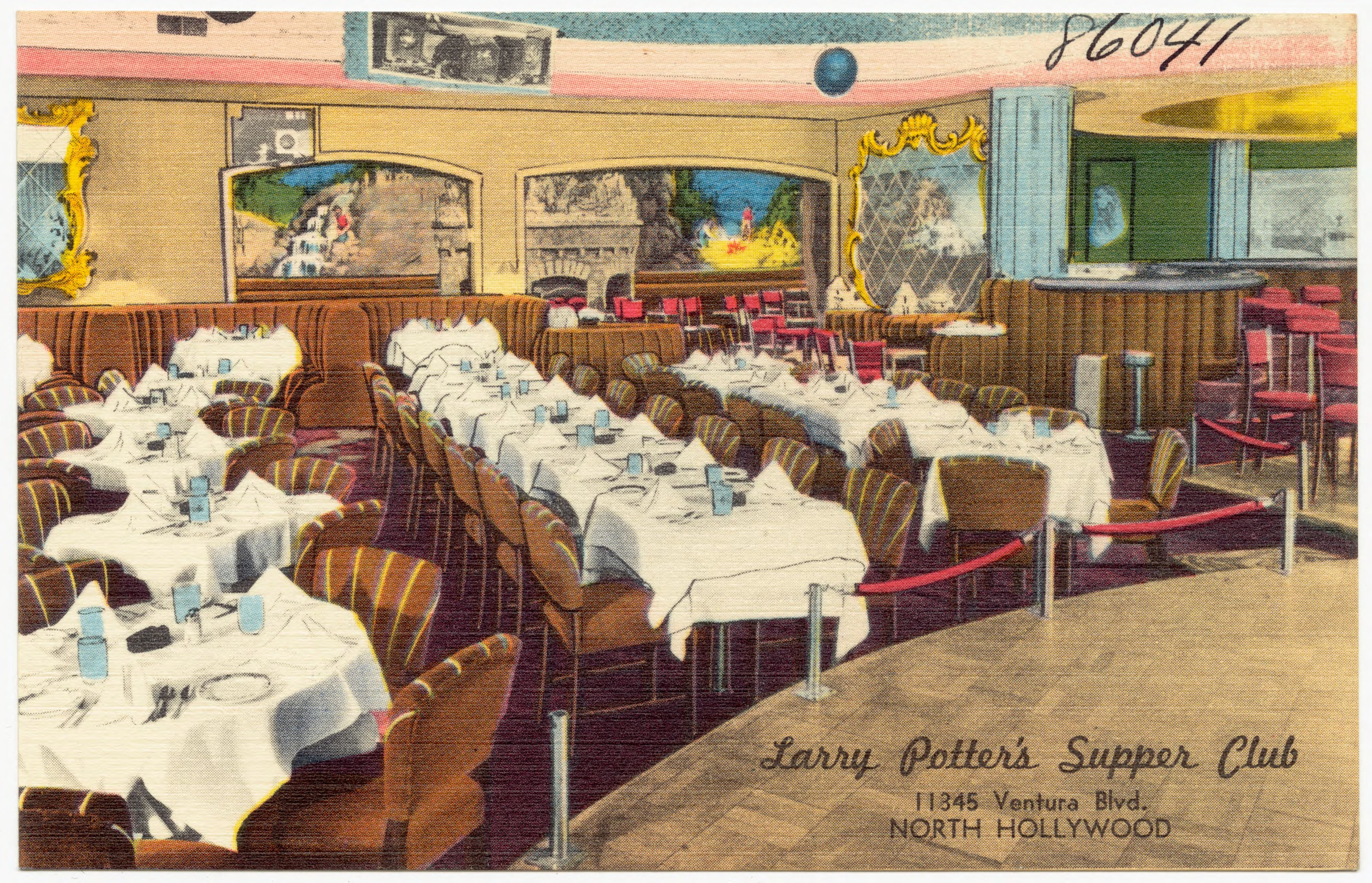
Postcard for Larry Potter's Supper Club, North Hollywood, between circa 1930 and circa 1945

A supper club is a traditional dining establishment that also functions as a social club. The term may describe different establishments depending on the region, but in general, supper clubs tend to present themselves as having a high-class image, even if the price is affordable to all. In the 2010s, a newer usage of the term supper club emerged, referring to underground restaurants.

== Other names ==
Supper clubs, when used in the newer context of underground restaurants, are also known as home bistros, guerrilla diners, secret restaurants, paladares, puertas cerradas, pop-up restaurants, guestaurants, speakeasies, and anti-restaurants.

== In the United States ==
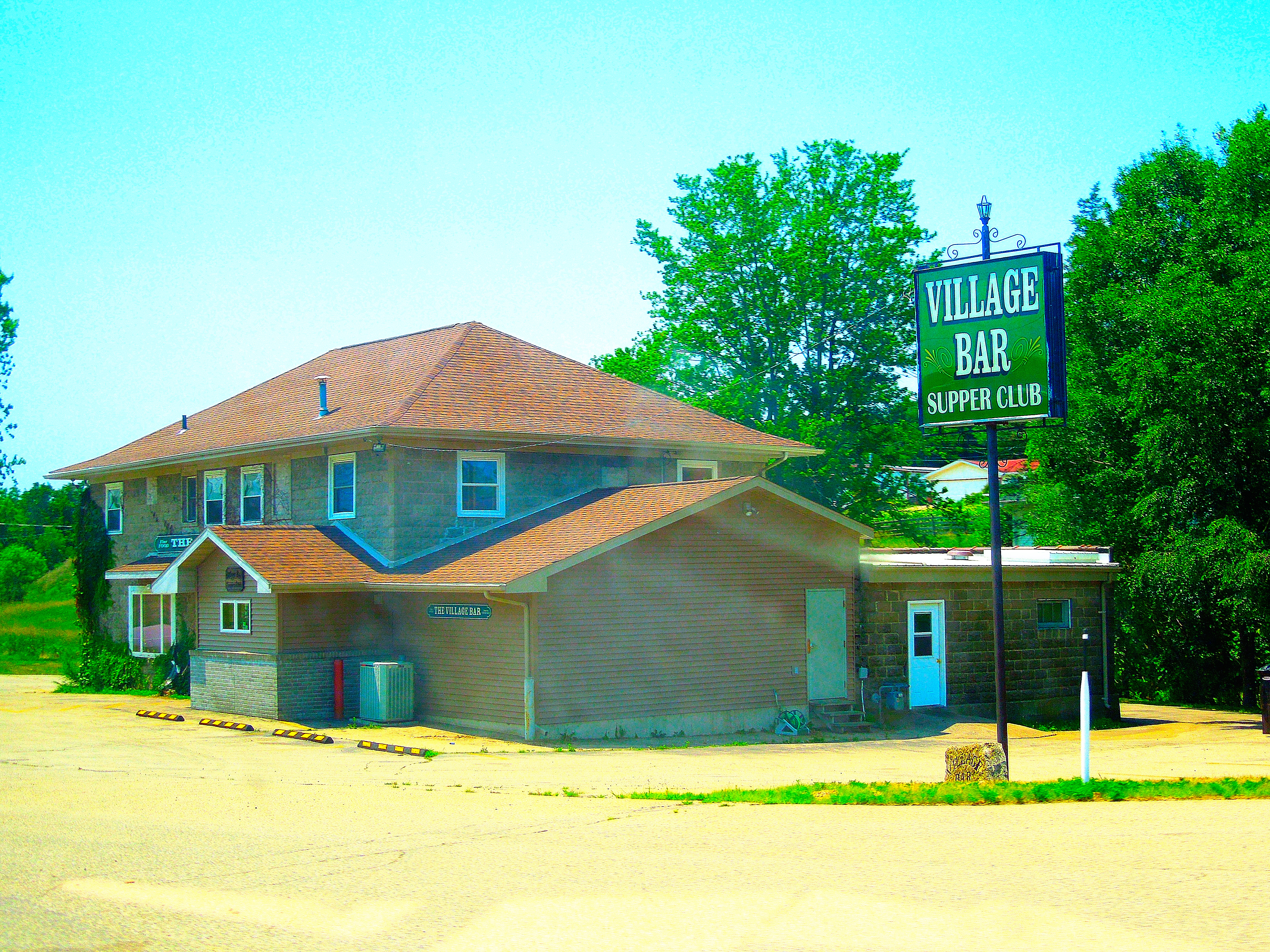
Village Bar Supper Club 2012 in Wisconsin

In the U.S., a supper club is a dining establishment generally found across the United States, but currently concentrated in the Upper Midwestern states of Wisconsin, Minnesota, Michigan, Illinois, and Iowa. These establishments typically are located on the edge of town in rural areas.

=== History ===
The first supper club in the United States was established in Beverly Hills, California, by Milwaukee, Wisconsin native Lawrence Frank. Supper clubs became popular during the 1930s and 1940s, although some establishments that later became supper clubs had previously gained notoriety as prohibition roadhouses.

Traditionally, supper clubs were considered a "destination" where patrons would spend the whole evening, from cocktail hour to nightclub-style entertainment after dinner. In recent years, a new meaning for "supper club" had taken root in various places. It is now often used to refer to restaurants which feature a relaxed and fun atmosphere, rather than the all-night entertainment destinations of the past.

=== Typical menu ===
Supper clubs generally feature simple menus with somewhat limited offerings featuring typical American cuisine. Dishes may include prime rib, steaks, chicken, and fish. An all-you-can-eat Friday night fish fry is particularly common at Wisconsin supper clubs, as are brandy old fashioneds. Relish trays with items such as crackers, cheese, carrots, green onions, pickles, cherry peppers, radishes, and celery are typically served at the table on Lazy Susans.

== In the United Kingdom ==
Supper clubs in the UK adopted the cabaret concept of the American 1930s and 1940s and aimed to bring the ambience of the underground New York jazz club to the UK entertainment scene, where people could enjoy a dinner without the formality of a ball, whilst enjoying live music. These clubs were often the centre of social networks in both rural communities and cities. Traditional supper club menus consisted of standard American fare, and in the UK there was a concerted drive to give the food and wine a British twist. Some supper clubs were purely informal dining societies, while others incorporated musical acts to complement the atmosphere. There was also a form of supper club which acted as an informal dating platform. Both have largely been replaced by modern nightclubs.

The term "supper club" is enjoying a revival with slightly different meaning – generally a small underground club (often with roving premises which are only revealed to the guests when they buy a ticket), where guests eat from a restricted or set menu, and are expected to fraternise with other guests whom they may not know.

In the 2020s in the UK 'underground restaurants' and 'supper clubs' started to blossom, with reviews in leading newspapers such as The Times and The Guardian.

== In Latin America ==
In Latin America, a supper club is typically an underground restaurant known as either a paladar or a restaurante de puertas cerradas (locked-door restaurant). Although technically illegal, this type of restaurant is built into the culture.

The attraction of the underground restaurant for the customer is the ability to sample new food at low prices outside the traditional restaurant experience. For the host, benefits are making some money and experimenting with cooking without having to invest in a restaurant proper. As one host told the San Francisco Chronicle, "It's literally like playing restaurant... You can create the event, and then it's over."

== See also ==
- Dining club
- List of supper clubs
- Song and supper room
