= Boardwalk Empire season 2 =

Boardwalk Empire
- Season 2
- DVD cover
- No. of episodes: 12

Release
- Original network: HBO
- Original release: September 25 – December 11, 2011

Season chronology
- ← Previous; Season 1 Next → Season 3

The second season of the HBO television series Boardwalk Empire premiered on September 25, 2011, and concluded on December 11, 2011, consisting of 12 episodes. The series was created by Terence Winter and based on the book Boardwalk Empire: The Birth, High Times and Corruption of Atlantic City by Nelson Johnson. Set in Atlantic City, New Jersey, during the Prohibition era, the series stars Steve Buscemi as Enoch "Nucky" Thompson (based on the historical Enoch L. Johnson), a political figure who rose to prominence and controlled Atlantic City, New Jersey, during the Prohibition period of the 1920s and 1930s. The second season takes place between February and August 1921. The second season was released on DVD and Blu-ray in region 1 on August 28, 2012.

== Cast ==
=== Main ===
Jack Huston and Gretchen Mol were promoted to series regulars for the second season after appearing in several episodes during the first season.

- Steve Buscemi as Enoch "Nucky" Thompson, the corrupt and Machiavellian treasurer of Atlantic City who tries to keep his title and reputation intact.
- Michael Pitt as James "Jimmy" Darmody, Nucky's former protege, a WW1 veteran who tries to defeat Nucky at all costs.
- Kelly Macdonald as Margaret Schroeder, Nucky's mistress and lover trying to reconnect with her past.
- Michael Shannon as Nelson Van Alden, an FBI agent who investigated but failed to capture Nucky last season. He now manages stopping bootlegging in Atlantic City.
- Shea Whigham as Elias "Eli" Thompson, Nucky's younger brother and the sheriff of Atlantic City who joins Jimmy's side to get rid of Nucky.
- Aleksa Palladino as Angela Darmody, Jimmy's newlywed wife, Tommy's mother and a closeted and aspiring artist.
- Michael Stuhlbarg as Arnold Rothstein, a New York gangster and gambler who is a former rival of Nucky's.
- Stephen Graham as Al Capone, Johnny Torrio's protege and Jimmy's friend who joins his side to further improve his career as a gangster.
- Vincent Piazza as Charlie Luciano, Rothstein's calculating but hot-headed protege who joins Jimmy's side to improve his gangster career.
- Paz de la Huerta as Lucy Danziger, Nucky's former mistress who is now psychologically tortured by Van Alden and pregnant with his baby.
- Michael Kenneth Williams as Albert "Chalky" White, Nucky's business partner and the leader of Atlantic City's Black community who faces trouble with the KKK this season.
- Anthony Laciura as Eddie Kessler, Nucky's comedic and bumbling German butler who suffers most of his boss's verbal abuse.
- Paul Sparks as Mieczyslaw "Mickey Doyle" Kozik, a Polish-American bootlegger who joins Jimmy's side to get rid of Nucky and is also investigated by Van Alden.
- Jack Huston as Richard Harrow, a half-faced WW1 war veteran and former sniper acting as Jimmy's bodyguard and right-hand man.
- Gretchen Mol as Gillian Darmody, Jimmy's mother who joins his side to get rid of Nucky.
- Dabney Coleman as Commodore Louis Kaestner, Nucky's former mentor and Jimmy's illegitimate father who joins his son to get rid of Thompson.

=== Recurring ===
- Charlie Cox as Owen Sleater, an IRA bomb-maker and assassin who joins Nucky's side as his bodyguard and right hand-man.
- Josie and Lucy Gallina as Emily Schroeder, Margaret's daughter and Teddy's younger sister.
- Bill Sage as Solomon Bishop, a Deputy US Attorney who arrests Nucky for election fraud.
- Heather Lind as Katy, Nucky and Margaret's new housemaid who has an affair with Owen.
- Declan and Rory McTigue as Theodore "Teddy" Schroeder, Margaret's son and Emily's older brother
- Anatol Yusef as Meyer Lansky, a New York gangster who joins Jimmy's side alongside Luciano and Capone.
- Robert Clohessy as Alderman Jim Neary, one of Nucky's henchmen in his political machine who joins Jimmy's side.
- Kevin O'Rourke as Edward L. Bader, the Mayor of Atlantic City and Nucky's business partner helping him to defeat Jimmy.
- Brady and Connor Noon as Tommy Darmody, Jimmy and Angela's young son and Gillian and Louis's grandson
- Dominic Chianese as Leander Whitlock, the Commodore's longtime lawyer and executor of estate and will who also becomes Jimmy's mentor briefly.
- Joseph Aniska as Agent Stan Sawicki, Van Alden's junior FBI agent and Clarkson's partner who investigates Mickey Doyle's warehouse.
- William Forsythe as Munya "Manny" Horvitz, a Ukrainian Jewish gangster in Philadelphia who's at odds with Jimmy Darmody and Waxey Gordon.
- Glenn Fleshler as George Remus, a German born bootlegger from Ohio who creates and sells medicinal alcohol and is Torrio and Capone's bootlegging partner.
- Erik LaRay Harvey as Dunn Purnsley, a career criminal from Baltimore who later teams up with Chalky White because of the prejudice they both face.
- Nick Sandow as Waxey Gordon, Rothstein's bootlegging partner in Philadelphia and Manny's rival.
- Adam Mucci as Deputy Halloran, Eli's bumbling and comedic deputy and second-in-command vying for the sheriff position.
- Julianne Nicholson as Esther Randolph, a Deputy US Attorney sent by Harry Daugherty to investigate Nucky, replacing George "Solomon" Bishop and Charles Kenneth Thorogood.
- Christiane Seidel as Sigrid, Van Alden's new maid and his newborn daughter Abigail's nanny who falls in love with him.
- Brandon Zumsteg as Brian Thompson, one of Eli's sons
- David Aaron Baker as Bill Fallon, Arnold Rothstein and later Nucky Thompson's lawyer.
- Matthew Broadley as Patrick Thompson, one of Eli's sons
- Pearce Bunting as Bill McCoy, a bootlegger, ship captain and partner of Nucky's who stays loyal to him and backs out of a deal with the Commodore.
- William Hill as Alderman George O'Neill, another of Nucky's henchmen in his political machine who betrays him for Jimmy.
- Christopher McDonald as Harry Daugherty, a political aide of President Harding and associate of Nucky's who tackles his election fraud case.
- Natalie Wachen as Lenore White, Chalky's wife and Adeline, Maybelle and Lester's mother
- Tom Aldredge as Ethan Thompson, Nucky and Eli's abusive father, now on his deathbed. This was Aldredge's final screen role before his real-life death the same year.
- Greg Antonacci as Johnny Torrio, Capone's mentor and boss who runs the Four Deuces and is also business partners with Rothstein, Nucky and Remus.
- Ed Jewett as Jess Smith, Harry's aide and associate
- Charlie Plummer as Michael Thompson, one of Eli's sons
- Ted Rooney as John McGarrigle, the leader of the IRA and Owen's mentor and boss who has a dispute with Nucky.
- Michael Zegen as Bugsy Siegel, Luciano and Lansky's young associate in New York
- Stephen DeRosa as Eddie Cantor, a comedian who is friendly with Nucky.
- Christina Jackson as Maybelle White, Chalky and Lenore's oldest daughter, Adeline's older sister, Lester's sister and Samuel's fiancee
- Peter McRobbie as Supervisor Frederick Elliot, Van Alden, Clarkson and Sawicki's superior in the FBI.
- Geoff Pierson as Walter Edge, an Atlantic City politician and associate of Nucky's.
- Enid Graham as Rose Van Alden, Nelson Van Alden's infertile and estranged wife.

== Episodes ==
No. overall	No. in season	Title	Directed by	Written by	Original release date	US viewers (millions)
13	1	"21"	Tim Van Patten	Terence Winter	September 25, 2011	2.91
January 1921. Nucky's power is put to the test by the alliance of Jimmy, Eli and the Commodore, who manipulate the Ku Klux Klan into attacking Chalky's bootlegging warehouse. Van Alden welcomes his wife to Atlantic City and puts on a show for her, while at the same time providing for Lucy, heavily pregnant with his child. Nucky is arrested for election fraud.
14	2	"Ourselves Alone"	David Petrarca	Howard Korder	October 2, 2011	2.59
Nucky is released from jail, and becomes aware of the defection of several key allies to the Commodore. Margaret takes an active role in helping Nucky's business and falls back on her old behaviors to retrieve incriminating pieces of evidence from his office. Jimmy visits New York to discuss new business proposals with Rothstein, Luciano and Lansky, and takes out his frustrations on a pair of well-connected Mafia hoods. Chalky, still in jail, exerts his authority on a mouthy cellmate from out of town.
15	3	"A Dangerous Maid"	Susanna White	Itamar Moses	October 9, 2011	2.86
Nucky reaches out to various sources for help in fighting the legal charges against him, and confronts Jimmy and the Commodore with an open declaration of war. Van Alden deals with an increasingly stir-crazy Lucy, and Margaret attempts to find more information about her estranged family. Capone visits Atlantic City to end Torrio's bootlegging arrangements with Nucky, while Rothstein smooths over a local Mafia don's dispute with Luciano and Lansky.
16	4	"What Does the Bee Do?"	Ed Bianchi	Steve Kornacki	October 16, 2011	2.55
Nucky looks to both Rothstein and Owen Sleater (Charlie Cox) as allies to fortify his position against the Commodore, who - unbeknownst to Nucky - has suffered a massive stroke, forcing Jimmy to take control. Chalky is released from jail, but finds himself uncomfortable in both his business and family life. Richard sits for a portrait and finds a sympathetic ear in Angela, while Van Alden's men meet with explosive consequences for investigating their superior.
17	5	"Gimcrack & Bunkum"	Tim Van Patten	Howard Korder	October 23, 2011	2.69
Nucky uses the Memorial Day celebrations as a chance to court the assistance of U.S. Attorney General Harry Daugherty (Christopher McDonald) in his election fraud case. Richard takes a trip into the woods and comes to a final decision, which is interrupted by a stray dog. Eli fails to switch sides back to his brother, and resorts to brutal means to keep the news of the Commodore's incapacitation quiet. Insulted by one of his wealthy backers, Jimmy takes Gillian's advice and recruits Richard to return the favor.
18	6	"The Age of Reason"	Jeremy Podeswa	Bathsheba Doran	October 30, 2011	2.63
Nucky helps reassure Margaret's son Teddy about his first confession, while Margaret grapples with just how honest to be in her own. Jimmy takes the advice of the Commodore's lawyer and strikes a bargain with Luciano and Lansky, following an attempted hijacking of Nucky's new liquor line. Lucy is forced to give birth herself while Van Alden faces Agent Clarkson in the hospital, and the birth has a surprise visitor. Senator Walter Edge (Geoff Pierson) forces Daugherty to appoint a more zealous prosecutor against Nucky.
19	7	"Peg of Old"	Allen Coulter	Howard Korder & Steve Kornacki & Bathsheba Doran	November 6, 2011	2.74
Nucky's life is in danger when Jimmy is pushed to a violent decision by Eli, Luciano, Lansky and Capone. Margaret reconnects with her family in Brooklyn, but not everyone is happy to see their long-lost sister. Van Alden finds himself making difficult decisions after the arrival of new prosecutor Esther Randolph (Julianne Nicholson) and Lucy's final decision in the wake of their daughter's birth. Owen finds the opportunity to perform a service, both for the IRA and for Margaret.
20	8	"Two Boats and a Lifeguard"	Tim Van Patten	Terence Winter	November 13, 2011	2.54
Nucky deals with his father's death in the wake of his own attempted murder, and comes to a surprise decision after consulting with Rothstein and Torrio. Angela rediscovers her free-spirited side thanks to a chance beach meeting, and has an honest conversation with Jimmy about their marriage and his business. Van Alden hires a nanny for his daughter Abigail, and Randolph begins interrogations for her federal case against Nucky.
21	9	"Battle of the Century"	Brad Anderson	Steve Kornacki	November 20, 2011	2.55
Nucky travels to Ireland, looking to make a deal with the IRA leadership: surplus Army weapons for Irish whiskey. Back home, Margaret's daughter Emily is stricken with polio, and Esther Randolph puts the pressure on Deputy Halloran. As the Battle of the Century approaches, Jimmy decides to take a hard line with Philadelphia gangster Manny Horvitz (William Forsythe). Chalky tells a former enemy, now his underling, to launch a strike by the Negro workers in Atlantic City.
22	10	"Georgia Peaches"	Jeremy Podeswa	Dave Flebotte	November 27, 2011	2.73
Nucky floods Atlantic City with Irish whiskey to cripple his enemies, and hires Rothstein's attorney Bill Fallon to defend him in the election fraud case. Jimmy faces internal dissent from his partners and pressure from his backers to end the workers' strike, but balks at Chalky's demands. Eli's effort to keep Deputy Halloran quiet leads to Esther Randolph pushing a murder charge on him, while Margaret turns to the church for help with Emily. Manny Horvitz's revenge against Jimmy takes a sudden, tragic turn.
23	11	"Under God's Power She Flourishes"	Allen Coulter	Howard Korder	December 4, 2011	2.97
Nucky and Fallon begin planning his defense strategy, aided by a discovery that brings an end to Van Alden's career. Blaming herself for Emily's polio, Margaret contemplates purging her sins in court. With Angela now dead, Jimmy travels to Princeton and, in a heroin-induced haze, recalls his school days there, from the start of his relationship with Angela to the fateful night his mother visited. Upon returning to Atlantic City, he confronts Gillian and settles family business with the Commodore.
24	12	"To the Lost"	Tim Van Patten	Terence Winter	December 11, 2011	3.01
Nucky takes steps to undermine Esther Randolph's case, proposing marriage to Margaret and accepting Jimmy's offer to silence a key witness. Chalky's conditions for ending the workers' strike are met, Van Alden flees to the Midwest with his daughter and nanny, and Luciano and Lansky bring their heroin deal to Rothstein. In the shadow of the Atlantic City War Memorial, Nucky and Jimmy's relationship comes to an end when their meeting is set to settle things. Margaret makes a fateful decision about the land deed Nucky turned over to her.

== Reception ==
=== Critical reception ===
The second season of Boardwalk Empire received positive reviews; on the review aggregator website Metacritic, the second season scored 82/100 based on 14 reviews. Another aggregator website, Rotten Tomatoes, gave the second season a 91% rating, based on 34 reviews with an average score of 8.2/10, with the site consensus stating "Boardwalk Empire delves deeper into both its intriguing supporting players and its rich tapestry of moral ambiguity."

=== Awards and nominations ===
The second season received 12 Primetime Emmy Award nominations for the 64th Primetime Emmy Awards and won 4 altogether. The series received its second consecutive nomination for Outstanding Drama Series, while Steve Buscemi was nominated for Outstanding Lead Actor in a Drama Series. The series won the Primetime Emmy Award for Outstanding Art Direction for a Single-Camera Series, Outstanding Cinematography for a Single-Camera Series for "21", and Outstanding Special Visual Effects Television Miniseries, Movie, or Special for "Georgia Peaches" at the 64th Primetime Creative Arts Emmy Awards. Tim Van Patten won the Primetime Emmy Award for Outstanding Directing for a Drama Series for "To the Lost".
