= Peg of Old =

- Boardwalk Empire episode
- Episode no.: Season 2 Episode 7
- Directed by: Allen Coulter
- Written by: Howard Korder; Steve Kornacki; Bathsheba Doran
- Cinematography by: Jonathan Freeman
- Editing by: Kate Sanford
- Original air date: November 6, 2011
- Running time: 58 minutes

Guest appearances
- Charlie Cox as Owen Sleater; Julianne Nicholson as Esther Randolph; Tony Curran as Eaominn Rohan; Robert Clohessy as Alderman Jim Neary; Kevin O'Rourke as Mayor Edward L. Bader; Anatol Yusef as Meyer Lansky; Devin Harjes as Jack Dempsey

Episode chronology
← Previous "The Age of Reason"	Next → "Two Boats and a Lifeguard"
- Boardwalk Empire (season 2)

"Peg of Old" is the seventh episode of the second season of the American period crime drama television series Boardwalk Empire. It is the 19th overall episode of the series and was written by co-executive producer Howard Korder, co-producer Steve Kornacki and Bathsheba Doran, and directed by Allen Coulter. It was released on HBO on November 6, 2011.

The series is set in Atlantic City, New Jersey, during the Prohibition era of the 1920s. The series follows Enoch "Nucky" Thompson, a political figure who rises to prominence and interacts with mobsters, politicians, government agents, and the common folk who look up to him. In the episode, Jimmy conspires against Nucky by hiring a hitman, while Margaret visits her family in Brooklyn.

According to Nielsen Media Research, the episode was seen by an estimated 2.74 million household viewers and gained a 1.1 ratings share among adults aged 18–49. The episode received extremely positive reviews from critics, who praised the performances, Margaret's storyline and directing.

== Plot ==
Nucky visits professional boxer and world heavyweight champion Jack Dempsey after training, asking him to promote the newly founded Radio Corporation of America before his incoming fight. Van Alden faces trouble in his personal and professional life; Lucy demands money for raising his baby, while his office is taken over by Assistant Attorney General Esther Randolph, who has been appointed as the new federal prosecutor for Nucky's case.

Jimmy explains his next strategy to Eli, Harrow, Mickey, Luciano, Lansky and Capone; he intends to replace Nucky with Alderman Jim Neary when the former goes to jail. To make sure there are no loose ends, they say he will have to kill Nucky, with Capone providing a hitman. Jimmy questions the deed, but Gillian convinces him that he must do it to prove himself.

Nucky offers to make a deal with Van Alden, in which he will take care of his debts if he becomes his informant with Randolph. Van Alden also discovers that with Nucky giving the needed money to Lucy, she abandoned the baby and has left his apartment. Eventually, Van Alden decides to cooperate with Randolph by providing her with Nucky's file, willing to testify.

Margaret visits her family in Brooklyn. She bonds with her sisters, although her brother Eamoinn is not delighted with her return. Their relationship has been strained since her departure from Ireland due to her pregnancy, and tells Margaret that their mother kept asking for her before she died. When she asks about his feelings, Eamoinn states he is indifferent to her. He returns money that she provided for them, claiming he does not want her involved with the family again and that no one there knows her. A devastated Margaret returns to Atlantic City.

As Dempsey is making his speech to promote RCA, Nucky is approached by Jimmy, who tells him simply that he needs to make a decision, regardless of if that decision is right or wrong. After Jimmy leaves, Capone's hitman pulls out a gun and shoots Nucky in the right hand, but is then killed by a federal agent tasked by Randolph to tail Nucky.

Owen follows Del Grogan, a traitor to the IRA. He corners Grogan in a restroom and strangles him with a garrote until he dies. He returns to Atlantic City, stopping by Margaret's house just as she returns from Brooklyn. After talking about their shared Irish roots and feeling alone in America, they kiss and start having sex.

== Production ==
=== Development ===
The episode was written by co-executive producer Howard Korder, co-producer Steve Kornacki and Bathsheba Doran, and directed by Allen Coulter. This was Korder's fifth writing credit, Kornacki's third writing credit, Doran's second writing credit, and Coulter's third directing credit.

== Reception ==
=== Viewers ===
In its original American broadcast, "Peg of Old" was seen by an estimated 2.74 million household viewers with a 1.1 in the 18-49 demographics. This means that 1.1 percent of all households with televisions watched the episode. This was a 4% increase in viewership from the previous episode, which was watched by 2.63 million household viewers with a 1.0 in the 18-49 demographics.

=== Critical reviews ===
"Peg of Old" received extremely positive reviews from critics. Phil Pirrello of IGN gave the episode a "great" 8.5 out of 10 and wrote, "'Peg of Old' spotlights the different approaches Nucky and Jimmy take to get their houses in order, and the consequences of doing it. Most who have any power on this show wield it like it's a blunt instrument. Slit throats and head shots over surgical strikes. 'Old' spends most of its time hinting that Nucky's more patient, 'turn of the screw' approach to fighting this war - and saving his own ass - will ultimately be Jimmy's undoing, especially as the rising gangster gets peer pressured into ordering the botched hit on Nucky."

Noel Murray of The A.V. Club gave the episode an "A–" grade and wrote, "'Peg Of Old' was taut, emotionally rich, lavishly produced, and it moved the plot forward in a major way. It was one of those Boardwalk Empire episodes — and there have been a number of them this season — that makes me feel bad for all those folks who gave up on the show before they could get to this point." Alan Sepinwall of HitFix wrote, "Terrific episode. One of my favorites of the season, which would have surprised me going in given how prominent Van Alden is."

Vulture wrote, "Here's hoping the show picks up again next week with more inspiration, instead of dutifully diversifying its attentions among an ever-thickening portfolio of narrative accounts." Michael Noble of Den of Geek wrote, "Blood relations can be as dramatic or as mundane as any human connection, but they are invariably tinged with additional drama. In this episode of Boardwalk Empire, Peg Of Old, the power of familial relationships take the leading position in the action."

James Poniewozik of Time wrote, "Much of all drama boils down to whether a character will do the right thing. What complicates drama, and life, are questions like: What is the right thing? What if there is more than one right thing, and they each contradict each other? What's the difference between doing the right thing and merely doing the righteous thing? What if there is no right thing, and what matters, instead, is simply doing something? 'Peg of Old' asked these questions of several Boardwalk Empire characters, and in the process, provided an overdue showcase for Kelly Macdonald." Paste gave the episode an 8.2 out of 10 and wrote, "As usual there were quite a few obvious gears turning in order to make things happen so neatly here, but Boardwalk Empire works so hard to make sure that motivations are in place that they work despite this. I can't say that a little more spontaneity wouldn't help the show at times, but now that it's fully hit its stride, the connections that it creates are so engrossing that its cold, mechanical nature can be ignored. Like Van Alden himself, it's overdetermined, but still fascinating to observe."
