= What Does the Bee Do? =

- Boardwalk Empire episode
- Episode no.: Season 2 Episode 4
- Directed by: Ed Bianchi
- Written by: Steve Kornacki
- Original air date: October 16, 2011
- Running time: 57 minutes

Guest appearances
- Charlie Cox as Owen Sleater; William Forsythe as Manny Horvitz; Enid Graham as Rose Van Alden; Chris Mulkey as Frank Hague; Jennifer Ferrin as Carolyn Rothstein; Kevin O'Rourke as Mayor Edward Bader; Victor Verhaeghe as Ward Boss Damien Fleming; Anatol Yusef as Meyer Lansky; Devin Harjes as Jack Dempsey

Episode chronology
← Previous "A Dangerous Maid"	Next → "Gimcrack & Bunkum"

"What Does the Bee Do?" is the fourth episode of the second season of the HBO television series Boardwalk Empire, and 16th episode overall. First aired on October 16, 2011, it was written by executive story editor Steve Kornacki and directed by Ed Bianchi.

== Plot ==
Nucky looks to Rothstein for a port to receive alcohol, since the Coast Guard is blockading Atlantic City. Rothstein suggests using Philadelphia as a port of call, with them needing to cut in his associate Waxey Gordon for the operation. He instructs Lansky and Luciano to oversee the Philadelphia delivery, to their chagrin. Nucky also sends Owen Sleater to bomb Doyle's still. Margaret asks for 'money for the children' from Nucky, which she proceeds to hide in her jewelry box.

The Commodore, unbeknownst to Nucky, suffers a stroke and can no longer communicate, forcing Jimmy to take control. Eli is unhappy, dubious that Jimmy can handle the situation without the Commodore's connections. While treating the bedridden Commodore, Gillian asks him if he remembers the time he raped her, then proceeds to slap him repeatedly.

Nucky throws Bader a birthday party, which Jack Dempsey drops in on. The prostitutes at the party were transported interstate, which is a federal felony. This prompts his attorney to suggest that Nucky use this as a means of making his election-rigging charges federal, thus enabling his connection with Harry M. Daugherty to assist him.

Angela asks Harrow if he'd consider posing for her. He agrees and as he sits for the portrait tells her about how he lost his love for his twin sister.

Chalky is released from jail. Having been able to provide good education and upbringing for his family, he gets angry at a dinner party, feeling his family and guest are condescending to him as a simple 'country' man.

Two of Van Alden's men begin to suspect him of corruption after witnessing him participating in dubious activities. When they investigate Doyle's store house, the bomb that Sleater set explodes, badly burning one of them.

== Title ==
"What Does The Bee Do?" is a children's poem from the late 1800s by Christina Rossetti. Margaret Schroeder's daughter recites it in the episode.

== First appearances ==
- Carolyn Rothstein: Arnold Rothstein's wife
- Travis Elkins: An African-American cook at the Ritz-Carlton who is tired of the abuse and prejudice he faces there every day.
- Jack Dempsey: A famous boxer sponsored by Nucky who is set to fight in a match later that year with Georges Carpentier.
- Samuel Crawford: Chalky and Lenore's upcoming son-in-law, Adeline and Lester's upcoming brother-in-law and Maybelle's fiancee and boyfriend set to marry her soon.
- Adeline White: Chalky and Lenore's youngest daughter and Maybelle and Lester's baby sister.
- Maybelle White: Chalky and Lenore's oldest daughter, Lester's younger sister, Adeline's older sister and Samuel's fiancee and love interest set to marry him soon.
- Munya "Manny" Horvitz: A Ukrainian Jewish butcher and Philadelphia mobster who is rivals with Waxey Gordon and forms a business partnership with Jimmy.
- Herman Kaufman: Manny's right-hand man, main lieutenant and childhood best friend.

== Reception ==
=== Critical reception ===
IGN gave the episode a score of 8.5 out of 10, saying that it "effortlessly hits that sweet spot between advancing the plot while developing characters, much in the same way that the Season 2 premiere did." The A.V. Club rated the episode an "A−".

=== Ratings ===
The episode was watched by 2.546 million viewers. It fell two tenths, to 1.0 million adults 18-49 rating.
