= Ourselves Alone (Boardwalk Empire) =

- Boardwalk Empire episode
- Episode no.: Season 2 Episode 2
- Directed by: David Petrarca
- Written by: Howard Korder
- Original air date: October 2, 2011
- Running time: 58 minutes

Guest appearances
- Dominic Chianese as Leander Whitlock; Ted Rooney as John McGarrigle; Erik LaRay Harvey as Dunn Purnsley; Charlie Cox as Owen Sleater; William Hill as Alderman George O'Neill; Anatol Yusef as Meyer Lansky; Robert Clohessy as Alderman Jim Neary; Kevin O'Rourke as Mayor Edward L. Bader; Victor Verhaeghe as Ward Boss Damien Fleming; Michael Zegen as Bugsy Siegel

Episode chronology
← Previous "21"	Next → "A Dangerous Maid"

"Ourselves Alone" is the second episode of the second season of the HBO television series Boardwalk Empire, which originally aired October 2, 2011. The episode was written by Howard Korder and directed by executive producer David Petrarca.

== Plot ==
Following his arrest, Nucky is taken to a holding cell and is reunited with Chalky, who tells him of the conspiracy against him. After his release from jail, Nucky discovers that almost all of his ward bosses and aldermen have joined Eli in his alliance with Jimmy and the Commodore. A stunned Nucky realizes that the only people on his side are Mayor Edward L. Bader and ward boss Damien Fleming, alongside Margaret and Eddie.

Margaret receives a visit from Owen Sleater, Nucky's new bodyguard and an IRA assassin. He tells her that Nucky needs to attend a meeting over an arms deal with IRA leader John McGarrigle. After Nucky returns home, he meets Owen and talks about his qualifications as a bodyguard; Sleater reveals his expertise as a bomb maker. That night, McGarrigle tells Nucky that the guns will aid the Irish War of Independence and asks him to retain Owen stateside, along with providing the money for the guns for the IRA.

Eli phones Nucky and gloats that he isn't going to live in his brother's shadow anymore. Meanwhile, Chalky receives a visit from his wife Lenore. He is moved to another cell with seven other inmates, including criminal Dunn Purnsley, who mocks Chalky for his illiteracy. Chalky has the other six inmates, who are all friendly acquaintances, brutally beat and injure Dunn.

In New York, Jimmy meets with Rothstein and Luciano to propose doing business together. Rothstein politely declines. Outside, Luciano tells an angered Jimmy to come to his and Lansky's card game. There, despite initial hostility, the three men agree to do business together. Jimmy learns about the crime boss of the Lower East Side, Joe Masseria, from Luciano and Lansky's friend and associate Bugsy Siegel. When Jimmy goes out for a walk in that neighborhood, he is ambushed by two of Masseria's henchmen. Jimmy takes out his skull crusher knife from his coat and stabs them to death before fleeing.

== First appearances ==
- Eunice: Nucky's government-assigned secretary.
- Lillian: One of Nucky and Margaret's housemaids alongside Katy and Pauline who is also Teddy and Emily's nanny.
- Pauline: Another of Nucky and Margaret's housemaids alongside Katy and Lillian who is also the house cook.
- Isaac Ginsburg: Nucky's lawyer hired to help him with his election fraud case and who also faces off against Solomon Bishop and later Charles Kenneth Thorogood.
- Benjamin "Bugsy" Siegel: A foul-mouthed and crazy Jewish-American associate of Meyer and Lucky who dislikes Joe Masseria.
- John McGarrigle: The leader of the IRA, Owen's mentor and an Irish nationalist who does business deals with Nucky.
- Dunn Purnsley: An African-American career criminal from Baltimore who gets acquainted with Chalky.
- Owen Sleater: A bomb-maker and assassin for the IRA and McGarrigle's protege who is sent to Atlantic City by him to be Nucky's bodyguard.

== Deaths ==
- Incrocci: Joe Masseria's nephew and enforcer who dies by getting his throat slit by Jimmy Darmody.
- Scarpelli: Joe Masseria's other nephew and enforcer and Incrocci's brother who also dies by being stabbed in the back by Jimmy Darmody.

== Reception ==
The episode received generally positive reviews from critics. The A.V. Club awarded the episode a B+ saying, "It’s moments like these—Jimmy in Rothstein’s office, Jimmy at the poker game, Chalky in a cell with Purnsley—that make Boardwalk Empire a much better show than its detractors allow." IGN gave it an 8 out of 10, noting the improved pacing, "'Ourselves Alone' seems to be a direct response to those who had issues with the overall pacing of last season, complaining that the gears on Nucky's political machine turned too slow. It's only the second episode of the new season, and Nucky's already plotting retaliation against those challenging him."
