= Battle of the Century (Boardwalk Empire) =

- Boardwalk Empire episode
- Episode no.: Season 2 Episode 9
- Directed by: Brad Anderson
- Written by: Steve Kornacki: Joseph E. Iberti; Rick Yorn
- Cinematography by: Bill Coleman
- Editing by: Kate Sanford
- Original air date: November 20, 2011
- Running time: 49 minutes

Guest appearances
- Charlie Cox as Owen Sleater; William Forsythe as Munya "Manny" Horvitz; Julianne Nicholson as Esther Randolph; Erik LaRay Harvey as Dunn Purnsley; Ted Rooney as John McGarrigle; Robert Clohessy as Alderman Jim Neary; Glenn Fleshler as George Remus; Adam Mucci as Deputy Halloran; Nick Sandow as Waxey Gordon; Anatol Yusef as Meyer Lansky

Episode chronology
| ← Previous "Two Boats and a Lifeguard" | Next → "Georgia Peaches" |
- Boardwalk Empire (season 2)

"Battle of the Century" is the ninth episode of the second season of the American period crime drama television series Boardwalk Empire. It is the 21st overall episode of the series and was written by co-producer Steve Kornacki, and directed by Brad Anderson. It was released on HBO on November 20, 2011.

The series is set in Atlantic City, New Jersey, during the Prohibition era of the 1920s. The series follows Enoch "Nucky" Thompson, a political figure who rises to prominence and interacts with mobsters, politicians, government agents, and the common folk who look up to him. In the episode, Nucky and Owen travel to Belfast to negotiate with IRA, while Margaret finds that Emily has polio.

According to Nielsen Media Research, the episode was seen by an estimated 2.55 million household viewers and gained a 0.9 ratings share among adults aged 18–49. The episode received critical acclaim, with critics praising the writing, cinematography and performances.

== Plot ==
Nucky and Owen arrive at Belfast to meet with John McGarrigle, IRA's leader. Nucky negotiates Irish whiskey for weapons, which he brought in his father's coffin. McGarrigle is not interested in a partnership, as he plans to work with their associates in London. As Nucky leaves, McGarrigle is shot dead, and fellow associate Bill Neilan states he will provide 10,000 cases of whiskey in exchange for 1,000 machine guns. Nucky accepts, but is disappointed that Owen couldn't prevent McGarrigle's death.

Margaret discovers that Emily is sick and takes her to the hospital, where she is diagnosed with polio. Emily is placed on quarantine, forcing Margaret to leave her at the hospital. Despite being aware of a possible infection, Margaret sneaks into her room to console her. After getting the notice from Nucky, Chalky tells Dunn Purnsley, who now works as a hotel cook, to start action. Dunn convinces his co-workers to fight back against their treatment and refuse to perform their duties at the hotel. Randolph continues her case against Nucky, asking for Deputy Halloran's testimony about Hans Schroeder's death.

Jimmy makes a deal with George Remus regarding their transportation routes. He also informs Waxey Gordon that Manny Horvitz killed one of his men, so Waxey decides to send a hitman. The hitman shoots him in the shoulder, but Manny gains the upper hand and kills him, discovering a matchbook belonging to a chop house in Atlantic City. That night, Jimmy and Harrow listen to the Jack Dempsey vs. Georges Carpentier fight at a saloon, where they manage to go out with two girls.

== Production ==
=== Development ===
The episode was written by co-producer Steve Kornacki, and directed by Brad Anderson. This was Kornacki's fourth writing credit, and Anderson's second directing credit.

== Reception ==
=== Viewers ===
In its original American broadcast, "Battle of the Century" was seen by an estimated 2.55 million household viewers with a 0.9 in the 18-49 demographics. This means that 0.9 percent of all households with televisions watched the episode. This was a slight increase in viewership from the previous episode, which was watched by 2.54 million household viewers with a 1.0 in the 18-49 demographics.

=== Critical reviews ===
"Battle of the Century" received critical acclaim. Matt Fowler of IGN gave the episode an "amazing" 9 out of 10 and wrote, "'Battle of the Century' was a wrenching, often difficult to watch, episode that saw the Thompson/Schroeder household come down with a nasty case of polio."

Noel Murray of The A.V. Club gave the episode a "B+" grade and wrote, "Like last week's Boardwalk Empire, 'Battle Of The Century' struck me as a little scattered: more intended to set up future action than action-packed in and of itself. That was the case thematically as well."

Alan Sepinwall of HitFix wrote, "This war isn't likely to end with Nucky dead, but there are going to be more unnecessary casualties, be they other men killed, or relationships damaged through absence or overconfidence." Seth Colter Walls of Vulture wrote, "Several of these arcs are tied together via anticipation, and then broadcast, of the Dempsey fight that we’ve been building to for weeks. The obvious symbolism of a contest beginning in earnest isn't as grating as you might fear."

Michael Noble of Den of Geek wrote, "The story takes place in a very precise time in history, and is pegged to a peculiar event, America's thirteen-year experiment at Prohibition. The show has always done well at establishing the setting, and of supplementing its fictional characters with historical figures. It is a delicate blend, but one that works, and in this episode, Battle Of The Century, the relationships of these people to the wider events of their period takes centre stage." Teresa Lopez of TV Fanatic gave the episode a 4.5 star rating out of 5 and wrote, "Granted, there wasn't a lot of violence (minus the icky meat cleaver scene), but there were plenty of underhanded dealings and vicious moves. This was a great followup to Nucky's departure from his Atlantic City office last week, giving us every reason to be excited for the final episodes of the season."

James Poniewozik of Time wrote, "Has Boardwalk Empire suddenly made Jimmy an idiot? It already seemed a bit out of character last episode for him not to realize that Nucky's surrender came too easily, and unusually rash for him to make a show of tossing Mickey over the railing at his victory party." Paste gave the episode an 8.2 out of 10 and wrote, "This strike was also an important part of the episode because it drove home what 'Battle of the Century' is about. While the show has gone out of its way to feature this boxing match and aligning the winner Jack Dempsey, this has little to do with the rest of the episode and more, I suspect, with the overarching story of Boardwalk Empire. In fact the episode is largely about the relationship between workers and their bosses, something the show's long been interested in but has rarely featured so much."
