= Two Boats and a Lifeguard =

- Boardwalk Empire episode
- Episode no.: Season 2 Episode 8
- Directed by: Tim Van Patten
- Written by: Terence Winter
- Cinematography by: David Franco
- Editing by: Tim Streeto
- Original air date: November 13, 2011
- Running time: 60 minutes

Guest appearances
- Dominic Chianese as Leander Whitlock; Charlie Cox as Owen Sleater; William Forsythe as Munya "Manny" Horvitz; Julianne Nicholson as Esther Randolph; Tom Aldredge as Ethan Thompson; Greg Antonacci as Johnny Torrio; Robert Clohessy as Alderman Jim Neary; Glenn Fleshler as George Remus; Anatol Yusef as Meyer Lansky

Episode chronology
← Previous "Peg of Old"	Next → "Battle of the Century"
- Boardwalk Empire (season 2)

"Two Boats and a Lifeguard" is the eighth episode of the second season of the American period crime drama television series Boardwalk Empire. It is the 20th overall episode of the series and was written by series creator Terence Winter, and directed by executive producer Tim Van Patten. It was released on HBO on November 13, 2011.

The series is set in Atlantic City, New Jersey, during the Prohibition era of the 1920s. The series follows Enoch "Nucky" Thompson, a political figure who rises to prominence and interacts with mobsters, politicians, government agents, and the common folk who look up to him. In the episode, Nucky faces more trouble in his domestic life, while Jimmy plans on his next move.

According to Nielsen Media Research, the episode was seen by an estimated 2.54 million household viewers and gained a 1.0 ratings share among adults aged 18–49. The episode received extremely positive reviews from critics, who praised Buscemi's performance, character development and pacing. For the episode, Steve Buscemi was nominated for Outstanding Lead Actor in a Drama Series at the 64th Primetime Emmy Awards.

== Plot ==
As Nucky recovers from the assassination attempt, he starts experiencing daydreams. To make things worse, Margaret informs him that his father has just died after having a stroke that was brought on by a government official confronting Eli over skipping many appointments for Randolph. Nucky and Eli attend their father's funeral. Nucky claims that he could not forgive his father for his past, but cries after Eli leaves.

Jimmy speaks with Capone over the phone, where he confronts Capone about the hitman. Part of the conversation is overheard by Angela, who leaves the house with their son. She goes to the beach where she meets a woman named Louise. Louise gets in trouble due to her bathing suit being too short, but Angela pays her fine. Their conversation prompts Angela to return home and question Jimmy about his life. When she asks if he tried to get Nucky killed, he confirms it. When she asks what motivated him, he confesses that he felt pressured by his mother's advice. Angela decides to leave for a party with Louise, where they kiss after being introduced to some of the guests. Jimmy later has a meeting with Manny Horvitz at the Commodore's house, where Manny reminds him about the money Jimmy still owes him and subtly accuses Jimmy of hiding behind the Commodore's money and power.

Van Alden hires a woman, Sigrid, to work as a nanny to his daughter Abigail. At the same time, Randolph interrogates Nucky, who refuses to disclose details on his business. After being informed that Capone was involved in his assassination attempt, Nucky meets with Rothstein and Torrio to discuss the matter. Eventually concluding that Jimmy and others were involved, Rothstein suggests waiting for a strategic opening instead of outright killing Jimmy. Nucky decides to inform Jimmy and the Commodore that he is resigning as treasurer, claiming the attempt on his life combined with his father's death made him re-evaluate things. He then meets with Chalky, telling him that his crew must go on strike, which will benefit Chalky and cripple Atlantic City's businesses that rely on the black community's labor to survive. He later asks Owen to schedule a meeting with John McGarrigle, the IRA's leader, intending to leave for Belfast as soon as possible.

Jimmy celebrates being made the de facto boss of Atlantic City with his partners and the aldermen at Babette's. In the middle of the celebration, Eli warns Jimmy not to underestimate Nucky. Jimmy angrily dismisses him, accusing Eli of trying to spoil his good time. Still unnerved by the encounter with Eli, he speaks with Mickey Doyle, who reminds Jimmy that he still owes Manny Horvitz money. Manny, down on the first floor of Babette's, encourages Jimmy to come down and join the party, while Jimmy shouts inaudible insults at Manny over the noise of the restaurant crowd and the music. Mickey warns Jimmy to stop. Jimmy, his anger finally reaching its peak, suddenly throws Mickey down off the balcony of Babette's onto a table below, right in front of Manny. The restaurant crowd is shocked by the violence as Jimmy and Manny stare coolly at one another in silence, before Jimmy walks away.

== Production ==
=== Development ===
The episode was written by series creator Terence Winter, and directed by executive producer Tim Van Patten. This was Winter's fifth writing credit, and Van Patten's seventh directing credit.

== Reception ==
=== Viewers ===
In its original American broadcast, "Two Boats and a Lifeguard" was seen by an estimated 2.54 million household viewers with a 1.0 in the 18-49 demographics. This means that 1 percent of all households with televisions watched the episode. This was a 8% decrease in viewership from the previous episode, which was watched by 2.74 million household viewers with a 1.1 in the 18-49 demographics.

=== Critical reviews ===
"Two Boats and a Lifeguard" received extremely positive reviews from critics. Matt Fowler of IGN gave the episode a "great" 8.5 out of 10 and wrote, "It became evident, while watching Nucky meet with Rothstein and Torrio, that the days of 'paying your dues' in the gangster business might be at an end. Along with bootlegging, this series is also chronicling the birth of modern organized crime and while it might seem like 'slow and steady wins the race,' we know, thanks to history, that hot-headed guys who don't like to pay their respect like Jimmy, Capone, Luciano and Lansky eventually take over the whole scene."

Noel Murray of The A.V. Club gave the episode a "B+" grade and wrote, "It took a while for this week's Boardwalk Empire to get revved up, especially given that it came after such a slam-bang episode. 'Two Boats And A Lifeguard' is more aftermath-y, and more elusive. Until Nucky makes his move, that is. Then the situation gets interesting in a hurry." Alan Sepinwall of HitFix wrote, "In the home stretch now, with four episodes to go. Now that Nucky's fighting back, I imagine things are going to get very interesting, no?"

Seth Colter Walls of Vulture wrote, "Unlike last week's mess of an episode, which featured three on-screen writing credits, this vastly superior hour comes from Terrence Winter's desk alone. The show is still setting up all its arcs for the final run of season two episodes, but this transitional hour feels both graceful and surprising." Michael Noble of Den of Geek wrote, "In this, the eighth of twelve episodes, we find ourselves moving into the season's climactic sequences and major battles are definitely brewing. The lines have been drawn, old alliances severed and new partnerships formed. The strongest break has been generational, between Jimmy and Nucky, Al and Torrio and Rothstein and Lucky and Meyer. The problem with the rising generation was a simple one, they were too stupid. Most of them still are. Johnny Torrio's joke about Romulus and Remus flies straight over Al's head, while Lucky and Meyer fail to understand Rothstein's double meaning of horse manure."

Teresa Lopez of TV Fanatic gave the episode a perfect 5 star rating out of 5 and wrote, "What I love most about Boardwalk Empire is its ability to constantly thwart our expectations. The show not only maintains a consistent level of quality but also allows the story and the characters to grow." Paste gave the episode a 7.3 out of 10 and wrote, "The show was continuing to build momentum for the last few weeks and then it just dropped off for a good 40 minutes here. It was a great ending, but most of what happened before that seemed inconsequential or, in some cases, only served to reemphasize things we already knew about characters."

=== Accolades ===
For the episode, Steve Buscemi was nominated for Outstanding Lead Actor in a Drama Series at the 64th Primetime Emmy Awards. He lost the award to Damian Lewis for Homeland.
