= Under God's Power She Flourishes =

- Boardwalk Empire episode
- Episode no.: Season 2 Episode 11
- Directed by: Allen Coulter
- Written by: Howard Korder
- Cinematography by: Bill Coleman
- Editing by: Kate Sanford
- Original air date: December 4, 2011
- Running time: 58 minutes

Guest appearances
- Charlie Cox as Owen Sleater; Julianne Nicholson as Esther Randolph; Michael Cumpsty as Priest Ed Brennan; Anatol Yusef as Meyer Lansky; Gabriel Olds as Noel Pearson

Episode chronology
← Previous "Georgia Peaches"	Next → "To the Lost"
- Boardwalk Empire (season 2)

"Under God's Power She Flourishes" is the eleventh episode of the second season of the American period crime drama television series Boardwalk Empire. It is the 23rd overall episode of the series and was written by co-executive producer Howard Korder, and directed by Allen Coulter. It was released on HBO on December 4, 2011.

The series is set in Atlantic City, New Jersey, during the Prohibition era of the 1920s. The series follows Enoch "Nucky" Thompson, a political figure who rises to prominence and interacts with mobsters, politicians, government agents, and the common folk who look up to him. In the episode, Jimmy's past is explored, while conflicts arise in Nucky's and Van Alden's respective lives.

According to Nielsen Media Research, the episode was seen by an estimated 2.97 million household viewers and gained a 1.3 ratings share among adults aged 18–49. The episode received critical acclaim, with critics praising Michael Pitt's performance, writing, directing and revelations.

== Plot ==
=== Flashbacks ===
In 1917, Jimmy attends Princeton University and dates a fellow student, Angela. Gillian visits the university and makes out with Jimmy's professor, prompting Jimmy to beat him. As he takes Gillian to her room, their state of drunkenness soon escalates into sexual tension, culminating into having sex. The next day, despite being told by Angela that she is pregnant, Jimmy, out of guilt and confusion over the encounter with his mother, leaves when he wakes up the next morning, deciding to enlist in the army and fight in The Great War. He steals a classmate's story about losing his brother on the RMS Lusitania as his motivation for enlisting.

=== Present day ===
Nucky is informed by Fallon that Randolph is building a case on him, and Eli and Van Alden might testify against him. Eli is pressured on participating, as Halloran's testimony on his role in Hans Schroeder's death could have severe consequences.

Jimmy, devastated by Angela's death, has not performed his duties, forcing his partners into re-arranging the shares. After seeing his share drop down, Mickey meets with Van Alden for a proposition, wherein Van Alden can raid one of their warehouses for money. Van Alden tells him to never contact him again.

As Nucky confers with Fallon about Van Alden, his servant, Harlan, overhears their conversation, recognizes Van Alden's name, and relays the story of Van Alden killing his partner during a church's river baptism to them both. Fallon compels Harlan and Deacon Cuffey to testify against Van Alden. Before Raldolph can arrest him, Van Alden shoots her partner and escapes the building. Margaret is called instead as a witness, and she reprimands Nucky for his actions, even telling him she knows about his involvement in Hans' death. Nucky warns her not to do anything against him.

Jimmy returns to Atlantic City and prepares Angela's funeral with Gillian. When she makes a crude remark about Tommy eventually forgetting Angela entirely, an irate Jimmy strangles her until the Commodore attacks him. After a scuffle with the Commodore, Jimmy stabs him in the abdomen. Gillian tells him to finish the job, so Jimmy kills his father before collapsing to the ground. The next morning, Jimmy finds that Harrow cleaned the scene, and finds Gillian with Tommy. Gillian states that everything is fine and hopes that he can understand what happened. She then takes a sleeping Tommy to sleep, claiming that he will not be a kid soon.

== Production ==
=== Development ===
The episode was written by co-executive producer Howard Korder, and directed by Allen Coulter. This was Korder's sixth writing credit, and Coulter's fourth directing credit.

== Reception ==
=== Viewers ===
In its original American broadcast, "Under God's Power She Flourishes" was seen by an estimated 2.97 million household viewers with a 1.3 in the 18-49 demographics. This means that 1.3 percent of all households with televisions watched the episode. This was an 8% increase in viewership from the previous episode, which was watched by 2.73 million household viewers with a 1.1 in the 18-49 demographics.

=== Critical reviews ===
"Under God's Power She Flourishes" received critical acclaim. Matt Fowler of IGN gave the episode an "amazing" 9.5 out of 10 and wrote, "One thing that I do enjoy about Boardwalk is that I can never quite predict where the show is headed. Things are set up for us, but the outcome is never quite clear like it might be on other shows. They teased a Margaret/Nucky split towards the end of Season 1 too, but this seems way more serious."

Noel Murray of The A.V. Club gave the episode an "A–" grade and wrote, "As is often the case with penultimate episodes of serialized TV seasons, a lot of what I think about 'Under God's Power She Flourishes' will be determined by how all of its various twists and turns play out. My initial impressions are these: This show's whole story may have just gone way off the rails. But even if it did, it did so with panache, and by no means without forewarning."

Alan Sepinwall of HitFix wrote, "Nucky and Margaret spend much of 'Under God's Power, She Flourishes' debating whether Emily's polio is divine retribution for their various sins, or if it's simply a terrible coincidence. But the episode itself sure suggests that Boardwalk Empire itself has recently come to believe in the idea of terrible justice rained down from on high – and that some sins can't be escaped, no matter how hard you try." Seth Colter Walls of Vulture wrote, "Something like this had to happen on the show. There'd been way too much hinting, and awkward-kissing, and 'winky' references, for this to not be an official thing that would be addressed. We just didn't know if it was still to come or if it was all in the past."

Michael Noble of Den of Geek wrote, "We've now seen twenty-two hours of Boardwalk Empire, so we could be forgiven for thinking that we've got a firm grasp on how it all works. And then comes 'Under God's Power She Flourishes', an episode that features as its central narrative device a lengthy, episodic flashback. That the structure is not the weirdest, or indeed most disturbing aspect of the episode tells you something." Teresa Lopez of TV Fanatic gave the episode a perfect 5 star rating out of 5 and wrote, "'Under God's Power She Flourishes' was an amazingly powerful episode that managed to raise our expectations for the show... again. My only complaint would be that so much happened this week that it's difficult to imagine what could possibly come next."

James Poniewozik of Time wrote, "Jacobean or Greek? This episode of Boardwalk Empire was definitely theatrical, and like Webster's The White Devil, rife with vengeance and corruption. But there was also more than a little Tennessee Williams in the episode's crazy-gothic domestic horror. And there was plenty of Sophocles, specifically Oedipus Rex, as evidenced by the episode's concern with whether a man is master of his destiny, or if his fate is predetermined, even from his birth." Paste gave the episode an 8.4 out of 10 and wrote, "Did the flashback structure work well? Well, yes and no. It did feel out of place and forced, not to mention slowing things down right before the season finale. That being said, these were some incredibly powerful moments."
