= The Age of Reason (Boardwalk Empire) =

- Boardwalk Empire episode
- Episode no.: Season 2 Episode 6
- Directed by: Jeremy Podeswa
- Written by: Bathsheba Doran
- Original air date: October 30, 2011
- Running time: 58 minutes

Guest appearances
- Dominic Chianese as Leander Cephas Whitlock; Charlie Cox as Owen Sleater; William Forsythe as Manny Horvitz; Christopher McDonald as Harry Daugherty; Geoff Pierson as Senator Walter Edge; Peter McRobbie as Supervisor Elliot; Michael Cumpsty as Father Brennan; Glenn Fleshler as George Remus; Nick Sandow as Waxey Gordon; Anatol Yusef as Meyer Lansky; Bill Sage as Solomon Bishop; T. J. Kenneally as Charles Kenneth Thorogood; Enid Graham as Rose Van Alden

Episode chronology
← Previous "Gimcrack & Bunkum"	Next → "Peg of Old"

"The Age of Reason" is the sixth episode of the second season of the HBO television series Boardwalk Empire, and 18th episode overall. Originally aired on October 30, 2011, it was written by staff writer Bathsheba Doran and directed by Jeremy Podeswa.

== Plot ==
Van Alden visits his colleague, who is badly burned. He talks to Van Alden and says 'I know what you did'. A distraught Van Alden calls his wife, saying he has sinned but will account for it. Later, Van Alden prepares to confess to his boss, when it is discovered that his delirious colleague has been saying the same thing to everyone he sees, and will die soon.

Alone in her apartment, Lucy gives birth to a girl. Van Alden arrives to find his wife Rose caring for Lucy. After receiving the call, Rose came to Atlantic City to help him, only to find Lucy. Van Alden claims that he did it for her, saying they will take the child. Rose storms off.

Teddy is to have his first confession. His priest says that, as his mother, Margaret also needs to confess. She confesses to having sexual feelings for Sleater.

The case against Nucky is taken over by federal prosecution. However, Attorney-General Daugherty is being coerced by Senator Edge into giving Nucky a hostile, ambitious prosecutor. Daugherty shares this information with Nucky, who proceeds to kick Thorogood, the man who was supposed to be his prosecutor and to assist in dismissing his case, out of the Ritz.

Jimmy speaks with Leander Cephas Whitlock, the Commodore's lawyer, who informs him that while the Commodore's backers did not like the murdered Jackson Parkhurst, that Jimmy has alienated his allies with his actions. He impresses upon Jimmy the importance of strategy and prudence to defeat Nucky. Jimmy affirms his intention to finish what he started.

Later, Jimmy spots Manny Horvitz's associate, Herman Kaufman, walking out of the Ritz with Nucky and Waxey Gordon. He informs Manny of this. Manny captures Herman in the basement of his deli, calls Jimmy down to Philadelphia, and has Jimmy kill Herman to prove his loyalty and reliability. Prior to his death, Herman informs them of Nucky's partnership with Waxey.

Afterward, Jimmy, Manny, and Richard ambush one of Nucky's alcohol deliveries from Philadelphia, only to find that Luciano and Lansky are heading the delivery. Luciano and Jimmy come to an arrangement: complete the delivery as planned, then meet to discuss the heroin trade. However, Manny kills one of Waxey Gordon's men to prevent him from informing Waxey about Manny's involvement in the hijacking and to send a message to Waxey.

== Title ==
In canon law of the Roman Catholic Church, the age of reason is the age at which children are considered capable of moral responsibility, and of understanding and participating in the sacraments; usually around seven or eight years old. In the episode, Father Brennan explains this to Teddy in preparation for his first confession.

== First appearances ==
- Father Ed Brennan: A Catholic priest in Atlantic City who is acquainted with Nucky and Margaret.
- Waxey Gordon: A Philadelphia gangster who is an acquaintance of Rothstein and a rival to Manny Horvitz.

== Deaths ==
- Waxey Gordon Deliver Driver: Shot to death by Jimmy causing the truck he was driving to crash.
- Nathan Klein: A henchman and delivery man for Waxey. He is shot to death by Manny as to not tell Waxey about the news of Manny hijacking his bootlegged crates.
- Herman Kaufman: Manny's right-hand man, main lieutenant and childhood best friend. He is captured, hanged upside down in Manny's meat locker by him and is killed by having his throat slit by Jimmy for betraying Manny to Waxey.
- Clarkson: A Bureau of Internal Revenue Agent, Sawicki's partner and best friend and Van Alden's junior. He dies in a hospital bed of injuries and disfigurement sustained in a warehouse explosion which he was close to and injured by as previously seen.

== Final appearances ==
- Rose Van Alden: Nelson Van Alden's estranged and infertile ex-wife.
- George "Solomon" Bishop: A Deputy US Attorney who is taking Nucky's election fraud case to the State Court.
- Charles Kenneth Thorogood: Another Deputy US Attorney with family connections to Harry Daugherty who is taking Nucky's election fraud case to Federal Court and clashing with Solomon as he does so.

== Reception ==
=== Critical reception ===
IGN gave the episode a score of 8 out of 10.

=== Ratings ===
The episode was watched by 2.629 million viewers, and fell a tenth to a 1.0 for adults in the 18-49 rating.
