= Georgia Peaches (Boardwalk Empire) =

- Boardwalk Empire episode
- Episode no.: Season 2 Episode 10
- Directed by: Jeremy Podeswa
- Written by: David Flebotte
- Cinematography by: David Franco
- Editing by: Tim Streeto
- Original air date: November 27, 2011
- Running time: 59 minutes

Guest appearances
- Dominic Chianese as Leander Whitlock; Charlie Cox as Owen Sleater; William Forsythe as Munya "Manny" Horvitz; Julianne Nicholson as Esther Randolph; Erik LaRay Harvey as Dunn Purnsley; Robert Clohessy as Alderman Jim Neary; Adam Mucci as Deputy Halloran; Kevin O'Rourke as Edward L. Bader; Michael Cumptsy as Priest Ed Brennan; Anatol Yusef as Meyer Lansky; Curt Bouril as Clifford Lathrop

Episode chronology
← Previous "Battle of the Century"	Next → "Under God's Power She Flourishes"
- Boardwalk Empire (season 2)

"Georgia Peaches" is the tenth episode of the second season of the American period crime drama television series Boardwalk Empire. It is the 22nd overall episode of the series and was written by David Flebotte, and directed by Jeremy Podeswa. It was released on HBO on November 27, 2011.

The series is set in Atlantic City, New Jersey, during the Prohibition era of the 1920s. The series follows Enoch "Nucky" Thompson, a political figure who rises to prominence and interacts with mobsters, politicians, government agents, and the common folk who look up to him. In the episode, Margaret receives bad news regarding Emily's health, while Jimmy has his role questioned by his partners.

According to Nielsen Media Research, the episode was seen by an estimated 2.73 million household viewers and gained a 1.1 ratings share among adults aged 18–49. The episode received generally positive reviews from critics, who praised the ending and character development, but criticizing the pacing and symbolism.

== Plot ==
The African-American workers remain on strike, and Jimmy is pressured by his partners to act. He gets pedestrians to attack the strikers in the boardwalk, but it proves to be unsuccessful. One of the attacked is Deputy Halloran, who decides to speak with Randolph about Eli's possible involvement. Jimmy tries to negotiate with Chalky to end the strike, but Chalky refuses. At the same time, he and his partners are entirely unable to sell their new alcohol due to Nucky supplying the entire city with Irish whiskey. They each commit to selling their share of the haul in their respective locales and Jimmy says he will head north. He shares a tender moment with Angela and has sex with her before he departs.

Margaret is informed that Emily will be crippled, disturbing her. When Teddy makes a cruel joke about her condition, she slaps him. Nucky decides to take Teddy with him on a trip to New York City to meet with Bill Fallon, Rothstein's attorney. After hiring Fallon, he talks with Teddy over his relationship with his sister, with Teddy admitting that he knows Nucky burned down his own father's house, but promises not to say anything. Seeking to demonstrate her devotion to God, Margaret decides to donate a large sum of money and jewelry to the church. Later, she is informed that Emily's polio worsened.

Van Alden continues to cooperate with Randolph, just as he discovers that Rose has asked for divorce. Based on testimonies, Randolph arrests Eli on murder charges. Manny Horvitz meets with Mickey and threatens him into revealing Jimmy's address. That night, he sneaks into his house and holds Angela at gunpoint just as a figure is taking a shower. He shoots at the figure, but is shocked to discover that it was not Jimmy, but Louise. A devastated Angela asks for mercy, but Manny tells her Jimmy is responsible for this, and kills her with a gunshot to the head. During this, Jimmy is seen driving a truck to Princeton.

== Production ==
=== Development ===
The episode was written by Dave Flebotte, and directed by Jeremy Podeswa. This was Flebotte's first writing credit, and Podeswa's third directing credit.

== Reception ==
=== Viewers ===
In its original American broadcast, "Georgia Peaches" was seen by an estimated 2.73 million household viewers with a 1.1 in the 18-49 demographics. This means that 1.1 percent of all households with televisions watched the episode. This was a 7% increase in viewership from the previous episode, which was watched by 2.55 million household viewers with a 0.9 in the 18-49 demographics.

=== Critical reviews ===
"Georgia Peaches" received generally positive reviews. Matt Fowler of IGN gave the episode a "great" 8 out of 10 and wrote, "'Georgia Peaches' was a bit of a quiet storm, with most things playing out in a typically respectful Boardwalk-ian manner – right up until the shocker of an ending! But does a killer ending make for a great episode? Well it can, but it still needs the weight and support of the rest of the chapter to help elevate it."

Noel Murray of The A.V. Club gave the episode a "B–" grade and wrote, "Well, that was quite the Bible-y episode of Boardwalk Empire, no? And while I mean no offense to the Lord, I must confess that 'Georgia Peaches' was easily my least favorite episode of this season, in large part because of that redolent stench of incense and scripture. I've got no issue with sincere depictions of religious faith on TV except when it's steeped in cliché, or when it turns a promising character into a stone drag."

Alan Sepinwall of HitFix wrote, "It's a lot for Terence Winter and company to wrap up in only two more episodes – unless the plan was for several of these stories (the prosecution of Nucky seems the most likely) to carry over into next year. But based on the strength of these last several episodes, I'm looking forward to seeing what comes next." Seth Colter Walls of Vulture wrote, "Here we have an episode in which everyone takes matters into their own hands (or at least tries). After weeks of hemming and hawing on multiple narrative fronts, the spirit of direct action is now spreading throughout the show's story universe like a virus."

Michael Noble of Den of Geek wrote, "The episode is brilliantly directed throughout, each scene exquisitely established, and opened and closed with a slow tracking shot. It creates the impression that the viewer is spying on these people, creeping in to hear them, and creeping out again, unseen. This style thrives on minimal set-pieces, and there’s an excellent selection this week." Teresa Lopez of TV Fanatic gave the episode a 4.5 star rating out of 5 and wrote, "For most of the show, I thought the entire episode was merely a way to transition to the finale, but the shocking death of a major character caught me off guard... in a good way. I love that the series can still be surprising even if we already anticipate the direction it may be going."

James Poniewozik of Time wrote, "'Georgia Peach' was an episode structured around retribution and people getting what they 'deserve,' but that is not to say that it was an episode about justice. People pay for transgressions, yes. But not necessarily the people who transgressed." Paste gave the episode an 8.5 out of 10 and wrote, "I appreciated the way this episode pulled together, not with itself thematically but also major strands that have been building all season and, in fact, since the show began. The lawsuit against Nucky and Jimmy’s ascendancy that have taken over the show and the second half of its season are much, much more interesting than what we saw in the first few episodes."
