= A Dangerous Maid (Boardwalk Empire) =

- Boardwalk Empire episode
- Episode no.: Season 2 Episode 3
- Directed by: Susanna White
- Written by: Itamar Moses
- Original air date: October 9, 2011
- Running time: 55 minutes

Guest appearances
- Charlie Cox as Owen Sleater; Christopher McDonald as Attorney General Harry Daugherty; Tom Aldredge as Ethan Thompson; Wayne Duvall as Governor Edwards; Danny Burstein as Lolly Steinman; Anatol Yusef as Meyer Lansky; Kevin O'Rourke as Mayor Edward Bader; Victor Verhaeghe as Ward Boss Damien Fleming; Ivo Nandi as Joe "The Boss" Masseria

Episode chronology
← Previous "Ourselves Alone"	Next → "What Does the Bee Do?"

"A Dangerous Maid" is the third episode of the second season of the HBO television series Boardwalk Empire and 15th episode overall. First aired on October 9, 2011, it was written by Itamar Moses and directed by Susanna White.

== Plot ==
Nucky reaches out to various sources for help in fighting the legal charges against him. To his dismay, many that he formerly did favours for are now turning a blind eye to his predicament. Capone visits Atlantic City to end Torrio's bootlegging arrangements with Nucky. Irishman Owen Sleater offers his services to Nucky. Richard Harrow is on a job for Jimmy, selling alcohol to one of Nucky's clients. Sleater informs the client that Harrow doesn't work for Nucky, and engages in a fight with Harrow's men. After a brief standoff, both men withdraw.

Nucky dines at Babette's with Margaret, Mayor Edward L. Bader, and his wife. As he attempts to order lobster, he is informed that the restaurant is out of it, right as he notices the Commodore about to take a bite of one. He walks over to the Commodore's and Jimmy's table, loudly spills the lobster on the floor, and publicly confronts Jimmy and the Commodore with an open declaration of war as they dine with the Governor of New Jersey, Edward I. Edwards. Later, when talking with Angela at home, Jimmy is shown to have been unnerved by the encounter.

Rothstein talks with Joe Masseria, a local Mafia don, over a dispute with Luciano and Lansky, which is largely based on the deaths of two of Masseria's nephews - the two men Jimmy killed while visiting Rothstein. Rothstein orders his men to pay compensation to Masseria.

An increasingly bored, depressed and pregnant Lucy contemplates throwing herself down the stairs after Van Alden forbids her to try out for an upcoming musical. Later, Van Alden sends her a record player and this noticeably lifts her spirits.

Margaret receives word that her estranged family from Ireland are now living in America. She unsuccessfully attempts to contact one of them. Margaret becomes friendly with her maid. But when her maid claims to know that Margaret is really 'Peggy Rohan', Margaret coldly disengages from the conversation.

== Title ==
A Dangerous Maid is a musical by George and Ira Gershwin. The script for it is given to Lucy by her friend Eddie Cantor.

== First appearance ==
- Joe Masseria: An Italian-American Mafia boss and Don of the New York Mafia who is also Luciano's mentor, Rothstein and Lansky's business partner and the deceased Incrocci and Scarpelli's uncle.

== Final appearance ==
- Lolly Steinman: The owner and manager of one of Atlantic City's casinos and an acquaintance of Nucky's.

== Reception ==
=== Critical reception ===
IGN gave the episode a score of 7.5 out of 10, saying that it had "... a very slow burn of a narrative that spends more time filling in backstory of certain female characters than it did pushing the Nucky vs. Commodore conflict forward." The A.V. Club rated the episode a "B+".

=== Ratings ===
The episode was watched by 2.856 million viewers. It was up a tenth with adults 18–49 in its third week, rising to 1.2 million in the 18-49 rating.
