= Gimcrack & Bunkum =

- Boardwalk Empire episode
- Episode no.: Season 2 Episode 5
- Directed by: Tim Van Patten
- Written by: Howard Korder
- Original air date: October 23, 2011
- Running time: 50 minutes

Guest appearances
- Dominic Chianese as Leander Cephas Whitlock; Charlie Cox as Owen Sleater; Christopher McDonald as Harry Daugherty; Richard Easton as Jackson Parkhurst; Robert Clohessy as Jim Neary; William Hill as George O'Neill; Heather Lind as Katy; Adam Mucci as Deputy Halloran; Kevin O'Rourke as Mayor Edward Bader; Victor Verhaeghe as Damien Fleming

Episode chronology
| ← Previous "What Does the Bee Do?" | Next → "The Age of Reason" |

"Gimcrack & Bunkum" is the fifth episode of the second season of the HBO television series Boardwalk Empire, and 17th episode overall. Originally aired on October 23, 2011, it was written by co-executive producer Howard Korder and directed by executive producer Tim Van Patten.

== Plot ==
Nucky makes a speech for a Memorial Day observance. He surprises Jimmy by inviting him to speak on stage, apparently to embarrass him, but Jimmy does an acceptable job.

Nucky courts the assistance of U.S. Attorney General Harry Daugherty in his election fraud case. He meets Thorogood, the DA for his case. Thorogood, Daugherty and Smith outline a scheme in which the case against Nucky will be dropped. Nucky wants a guarantee, but is not given one.

Richard Harrow flicks through his scrapbook before taking a trip into the woods. He prepares to commit suicide, but is interrupted by a stray dog. After meeting and talking with two hunters who convince him not to try to kill himself again, Richard returns to Atlantic City.

The Commodore's wealthy backers are upset at Jimmy for the destruction of Mickey's warehouse and demand to know how they will be paid the money that the Commodore owes them. One of them, Jackson Parkhurst, insults Jimmy during the meeting and hits him in the head with his cane. Jimmy storms out of the meeting and tells Eli he is done with the Commodore's backers. Jimmy is advised by Gillian to make an example of Parkhurst. In the middle of the night, as Parkhurst relaxes in his home, Jimmy and Richard break in and scalp him.

With cold feet after the Commodore's stroke and Jimmy's poor reaction to their meeting with their benefactors, Eli attempts to rejoin Nucky by informing him of the Commodore's situation. Nucky calls Eli a backstabber and refuses the apology. They proceed to have a violent fight in Nucky's house, which ends with Margaret holding Eli at gunpoint and kicking him out of the house.

Later, Alderman George O'Neill confronts Eli at his home with the rumor of the Commodore's stroke. Eli tries ineffectually to lie about the Commodore's condition. O'Neill does not believe him and says that he wants out of their deal. This results in Eli suddenly and accidentally killing a flustered O'Neill as he tries to get him to stop talking, driving himself to near exhaustion while finishing him off. Eli digs a hole and dumps O'Neill's body into it.

== Title ==
Gimcrack is defined as "something showy but worthless". Bunkum is defined as "speechmaking designed for show or public applause."

== First appearances ==
- Brian Thompson: One of Eli and June's younger sons and William's younger brother.
- Charles Kenneth Thorogood: A Deputy US Attorney with family connections to Harry Daugherty who is assigned to Nucky's case alongside Solomon.

== Deaths ==
- George O'Neill: A former alderman for Nucky who is now working with the Commodore to bring him down and is beaten to death with a wrench by Eli in a heated moment.
- Jackson Parkhurst: A war profiteer and veteran of the Wagon Box Fight in Red Cloud's War who is also a financial backer for the Commodore and a member of his yacht club. He is at odds with Jimmy due to his clumsy leadership and is scalped to death by him and Richard Harrow for humiliating the former in a meeting.

== Reception ==
=== Critical reception ===
IGN gave the episode a score of 9 out of 10, saying that "Boardwalk's best when it balances its jolts of violence with contemplative moments for its very complicated characters. "Gimcrack & Bunkum" is Boardwalk at its best."

=== Ratings ===
The episode was watched by 2.691 million viewers, and rose one tenth to a 1.1 adults 18-49 rating.
