= A for Andromeda (2006 film) =

- Kelly Reilly as Andromeda and Tom Hardy as Fleming
- Genre: Science fiction thriller
- Created by: Fred Hoyle; John Elliot
- Written by: Richard Fell
- Directed by: John Strickland
- Starring: Kelly Reilly; Charlie Cox; Tom Hardy; Jane Asher
- Composer: Nina Humphreys
- Country of origin: United Kingdom
- Original language: English

Production
- Executive producers: Richard Fell; Bethan Jones
- Producer: Alison Willett
- Cinematography: Sean Van Hales
- Editor: Patrick Moore
- Running time: 85 minutes

Original release
- Network: BBC Four
- Release: 27 March 2006

A for Andromeda is a 2006 remake of the 1961 TV series of the same name by Fred Hoyle and John Elliot.

== Plot ==
The plot centres on a group of scientists who detect a radio signal from another galaxy that contains instructions for the design of an advanced computer. When the computer is built, it gives the scientists instructions for the creation of a living organism named Andromeda, but one of the scientists, John Fleming, fears that Andromeda's purpose is to subjugate humanity.

== Cast ==
- Tom Hardy as John Fleming
- Charlie Cox as Dennis Bridger
- Kelly Reilly as Christine Jones / Andromeda
- Jane Asher as Professor Madeleine Dawnay
- David Haig as General Vandenberg
- Colin Stinton as Kaufman

== Production ==
The series was produced by Richard Fell, who the previous year had overseen The Quatermass Experiment, a live remake of the 1953 TV series of the same name, also largely absent from the BBC archives.

Talking about the decision to commission the remake, Fell said, "We thought A for Andromeda was too good an opportunity to miss... it is the obvious follow up [to The Quatermass Experiment]. It had a huge impact when it arrived. It's also lost to the TV archives and it was an amazing story and, like Quatermass, very forward looking". He added, "It raises themes about artificial intelligence, cloning, biological warfare and the political exploitation of science which are as important today as they were when it was written – if not more so. It is also a strange kind of love story, if a man can fall in love with a machine that is".

Fell also adapted Hoyle and Elliot's original teleplays; at 85 minutes, this new version was much shorter than the original which ran for almost 300 minutes. In condensing the script, Fell used considerably fewer characters and locations. This included resetting the location from a radio telescope to a signals intelligence ground station. Fell also merged several characters – for instance, Judy Adamson and Christine were merged into the character of Christine; the Madeline Dawnay character combined the roles of both the original Dawnay character and that of Rheinhart while General Vandenberg took on the role of many of the authority figures from the original.

Cast as Christine/Andromeda was Kelly Reilly. Fleming was played by Tom Hardy. Bridger was played by Charlie Cox and Vandenberg by David Haig. Dawnay was played by Jane Asher; Fell had hoped to be able to cast Julie Christie in this role as a nod to the original but the actress was unavailable. Directed by John Strickland, it was shot on location in early 2006 at Stanmore Air Base and the Brecon Beacons.

== Reception ==
First broadcast on Monday, 27 March 2006 on BBC Four, it was watched by 580,000 viewers, making it the top rated programme on BBC Four for that week. Reviewing the production for the Independent on Sunday, Hermione Eyre said:

I squirmed as I watched, because I really liked it, even though I knew I shouldn't. The attempts at making the cast seem like convincing astrobiologists were risible. They swanned round in fitted white coats, occasionally sucking their pen tops as if deep in thought and then going rat-at-a-tat carelessly on their vast computer keyboards, more as if they were playing the honky-tonk piano than typing complex binary code to outer space. But this lent the programme a hammy, homemade charm.
