= Treason (TV series) =

British spy thriller miniseries

- Official poster
- Genre: Drama; Spy thriller
- Created by: Matt Charman
- Written by: Matt Charman; Amanda Duke
- Directed by: Louise Hooper; Sarah O'Gorman
- Starring: Olga Kurylenko; Oona Chaplin; Ciarán Hinds; Charlie Cox
- Composer: Jamie Salisbury
- Country of origin: United Kingdom
- Original language: English
- No. of series: 1
- No. of episodes: 5

Production
- Executive producers: Foz Allen; Valery Ryan; Matt Charman
- Producer: Bryony Arnold
- Editor: Ben Drury
- Running time: 37–44 minutes

Original release
- Network: Netflix
- Release: 26 December 2022

Treason is a British spy thriller television miniseries created by Matt Charman for the streaming service Netflix. It stars Olga Kurylenko, Oona Chaplin, Ciarán Hinds, and Charlie Cox. It was released on 26 December 2022, consisting of five episodes.

== Synopsis ==
The chief of MI6, Sir Martin Angelis, is hospitalised after being poisoned with a non-lethal dose administered in his whisky. His deputy chief, Adam Lawrence, is elevated into the position of chief while Sir Martin is recuperating. Adam takes a photo of the four books that were given to Sir Martin under Adam's name. The book's titles and authors are a code that Adam deciphers that gives him the address and person he is to meet.

When Adam arrives, he meets Kara, a former lover and ex SVR operative, who discloses that she poisoned Sir Martin and has been engineering events that have accelerated Adam's career, so that he is now a heartbeat away from the top position in MI6. Kara requests that Adam provide information to her that will help her. Adam is now compromised, and his career could face ruination if Kara discloses the incidents that she has manipulated to assist Adam's career. The CIA and other prominent Agencies in the British Government have questions about Adam's past and his loyalty. The CIA initiates ongoing surveillance. The head of the CIA surveillance team, Dede, makes contact with Adam's wife, Maddy. They served together in Afghanistan.

Under the guise of catching up with an old friend, she establishes a confidants role. Kara again makes contact with Adam and discloses that the IDR has planted an explosive on a cross-channel ferry, which she is willing to give information on in exchange for the MI6 files on 5 men killed in Baku that were part of Kara's team. When Maddy meets with Dede again, she discloses that Adam bought a record from a store which felt off. Dede assures Maddy that it is probably nothing to worry about, though gives her a recording pen. When Adam's daughter, Ella, leaves school without her protection officer, she is followed and taken by two unknown people. Adam realises that there are ongoing threats to his family, and that he cannot trust anyone. However, he is being drawn further and further into the web that Kara is spinning.

== Cast ==
- Olga Kurylenko as Kara Yusova, a Russian spy and former SVR operative who is investigating the murder of five of her men
- Oona Chaplin as Maddy Lawrence, Adam's wife
- Ciarán Hinds as Sir Martin Angelis, the former Chief of MI6
- Charlie Cox as Adam Lawrence, an MI6 officer who becomes head of the organization after Angelis is poisoned; Maddy's husband and Kara's former lover
- Tracy Ifeachor as Dede Alexander, an agent of the CIA and a friend of Maddy investigating Adam and Kara
- Danila Kozlovsky as Lord Anton Melnikov, an old acquaintance of Kara
- Samuel Leakey as Callum Lawrence, Adam's son and Maddy's stepson
- Beau Gadsdon as Ella Lawrence, Adam's daughter and Maddy's stepdaughter
- Simon Lenagan as Robert Kirby, running to win the ruling party's leadership and thus become Prime Minister
- Alex Kingston as Audrey Gratz, UK Foreign Secretary also running for the leadership/PM-ship
- Avital Lvova as Irina Belova, Kara's former boss in the SVR
- Adam James as Patrick Hamilton, an MI6 agent and Adam's friend

== Episodes ==
No.	Title	Directed by	Written by	Original release date
1	"Episode 1"	Louise Hooper	Matt Charman	26 December 2022
2	"Episode 2"	Louise Hooper	Matt Charman & Amanda Duke	26 December 2022
3	"Episode 3"	Louise Hooper	Matt Charman & Amanda Duke	26 December 2022
4	"Episode 4"	Sarah O'Gorman	Matt Charman & Amanda Duke	26 December 2022
5	"Episode 5"	Sarah O'Gorman	Matt Charman	26 December 2022

== Reception ==
On the review aggregator website Rotten Tomatoes, 71% of 18 critics' reviews are positive, with an average rating of 6/10. The website's consensus reads: "Treason may take itself too seriously but could deliver thrills to fans of the double-crossing espionage genre."

In its review, The Hollywood Reporter said: "Treason is only five episodes long and each episode is under 46 minutes, making it one of those shows in which brevity is both its best and worst quality. It unquestionably races along… with characters constantly rushing off to secretive meetings at different London locations… But the events of the story take place within possibly two or three days and manage to be too derivative for the show to earn much credit as plot-driven, and too rushed for it to succeed as character-driven." The Guardian described the series as a "gripping... fun, frenetic espionage thriller" but questioned its lead's hard-man credentials: "Cox is less an international man of mystery and more a lovely Labrador". The Independent negatively reviewed the series: "Overambition is clearly preferable to a lack of creative aspiration. It's a shame, then, that Treason is so relentlessly preposterous. Not only does Cox utterly fail to convince as someone competent or ambitious enough to be made head of MI6 at 40, but the show insists on saddling him with endless cliché."
