= Richard Easton =

Canadian actor (1933–2019)

- Born: John Richard Easton; March 22, 1933; Montreal, Quebec, Canada
- Died: December 2, 2019 (aged 86); New York City, New York, U.S.
- Occupation: Actor
- Years active: 1951–2013

John Richard Easton (March 22, 1933 – December 2, 2019) was a Canadian stage, television and film actor. Easton began his career with Ottawa's Canadian Repertory Theatre, followed by a long career on the stage at the Crest Theatre, Stratford Festival, Shakespeare Memorial Theatre, in various Broadway theatre roles, the Royal Shakespeare Company and the Renaissance Theatre Company. He is perhaps best known for his portrayal of Brian Hammond in the 1970s BBC serial The Brothers.

== Life and career ==
Easton was born in Montreal, Quebec, Canada, the son of Mary Louise (née Withington) and Leonard Idell Easton, a civil engineer. He started acting in a children's theatre group. He played Hamlet in high school and studied with Eleanor Stuart. He made his professional acting debut with the Brae Manor Playhouse in 1947. In 1951, at the age of seventeen, he moved to Ottawa to join the Canadian Repertory Theatre. In 1953, he joined the Stratford Festival in its inaugural season and inaugural production of Richard III.

From 1956 through 1958, Easton appeared in six Crest Theatre stage productions in Toronto.

His first appearance in New York came in 1957 in an off-Broadway production by the Phoenix Theatre. He next appeared at the Stratford, Connecticut Shakespeare Festival. He appeared with the APA Repertory in 1961 in Hamlet, Exit the King in 1967 and The Misanthrope in 1969.

He played Edgar opposite the King Lear of John Gielgud and, on Broadway, Charles Surface in The School for Scandal with Gielgud and Ralph Richardson.

From 1972 to 1976, Easton appeared as Brian Hammond in the 1970s BBC serial The Brothers. He also had television guest appearances on Doctor Who, L.A. Law, Frasier, and Ed.

After The Brothers, Easton worked in British repertory theatre, leading to work with the Royal Shakespeare Company until 1986, when he joined the Renaissance Theatre Company. With the Renaissance company he played Jaques in As You Like It and Claudius in Hamlet.

In 2001, Easton won Tony and Drama Desk Awards for Best Actor in Tom Stoppard's The Invention of Love.

In 2002, Easton starred in the title role in a three-part documentary, Benjamin Franklin, on PBS. Between 2005 and 2011, Easton again appeared as Benjamin Franklin in a series of commercials and videos about Freemasonry, produced for the Grand Lodge of Massachusetts A.F. & A.M.

On October 18, 2006, while performing Tom Stoppard's The Coast of Utopia on stage during the show's second preview at the Lincoln Center Theater's Vivian Beaumont Theater, Easton suffered a heart attack and collapsed. His heart stopped beating, but after co-star Martha Plimpton realized that Easton's fall was serious and asked the audience if a doctor was present, a stagehand stepped up to perform CPR. An ambulance was called and Easton was revived with defibrillation. He underwent a procedure to correct a heart arrhythmia, briefly delaying the opening of the play, in which he played a central role. He made a full recovery and returned to the play soon after the incident.

In 2008, Easton was inducted into the American Theater Hall of Fame.

In 2011, Easton made a guest appearance in the second season of Boardwalk Empire, appearing as Jackson Parkhurst in the episode "Gimcrack & Bunkum".

One of his last notable appearances in media was as the voice of Nigel, the eccentric celebrity fanatic in the game Grand Theft Auto V.

Easton died on December 2, 2019, at the age of 86.

== Filmography ==
=== Film ===
Film
Year	Title	Role	Notes
1976	Feelings		(Unknown Role)
1983	Young Warriors	Bartender	
1989	Henry V	Constable of France Charles D'Albret	
1991	Dead Again	Father Timothy	
2000	Finding Forrester	Prof. Matthews	
2005	Stealing Martin Lane	Ed	
2005	It's About Time	Mr. Dawson	
2005	Pizza	Mr. Mitchell	
2008	Revolutionary Road	Mr. Givings	

=== Television ===
Television
Year	Title	Role	Notes
1959	Play of the Week	Beliaev	1 episode
1960	The DuPont Show of the Month		1 episode
1963	No Hiding Place	Simon McCowen	1 episode
1972–1976	The Brothers	Brian Hammond	85 episodes
1982	Doctor Who	Captain Stapley	4 episodes
1997	Frasier	Mel White	Episode: "Ham Radio"
2002	Benjamin Franklin	Benjamin Franklin	PBS mini series 3 episodes
2004	Law & Order: Special Victims Unit	Richard Sutton	Episode: "Bound"
2007	Alexander Hamilton	George Washington	Voice
2011	Boardwalk Empire	Jackson Parkhurst	Episode: "Gimcrack & Bunkum"
2011	Mildred Pierce	Charlie Hannen	Episode: 3

=== Stage ===
- Richard III - Sir Thomas Vaughan (1953 Stratford Festival production)
- King Lear - Edgar (1955 Shakespeare Memorial Theatre production)
- The School for Scandal (1956 Crest Theatre production)
- The Italian Straw Hat (1956 Crest Theatre production)
- The Three Sisters (1956 Crest Theatre production)
- Antony and Cleopatra (1956 Crest Theatre production)
- She Stoops to Conquer (1957 Crest Theatre production)
- Salad Days (1958 Crest Theatre production)
- Hamlet - Hamlet (1961 APA Repertory Theatre production)
- Exit the King - Berenger (1967 APA-Phoenix Theatre production)
- The Misanthrope - Alceste (1969 APA-Phoenix Theatre production)
- Hamlet - Claudius (1969 Lyceum Theatre production)
- As You Like It - Jaques (1986 Renaissance Theatre Company production)
- Hamlet - Claudius (1986 Renaissance Theatre Company production)
- The Invention of Love - A. E. Housman, aged 77 (2001)
- Noises Off - Selsdon Mowbray (2001 Royal National Theatre production)
- Henry IV, Parts 1 and 2 - Henry IV (2003 Lincoln Center production)
- The Coast of Utopia - Alexander Bakunin/Leonty Ibayev/Stanislaw Worcell (2006 Lincoln Center production)
- Elling - Alfons (2010 Broadway production)

=== Video games ===
Videogames
Year	Title	Role
2007	Manhunt 2	Watchdogs member
2013	Grand Theft Auto V	Nigel

== Awards ==
Year	Award	Category	Film/TV Show/Play	Result
2001	Tony Award	Best Performance by a Leading Actor in a Play	The Invention of Love	Won
2001	Drama Desk Award	Outstanding Actor in a Play		Won
