= 21 (Boardwalk Empire) =

- Boardwalk Empire episode
- Nucky addresses the public after Chalky White shoots a Klansman
- Episode no.: Season 2 Episode 1
- Directed by: Tim Van Patten
- Written by: Terence Winter
- Original air date: September 25, 2011
- Running time: 54 minutes

Guest appearances
- Dominic Chianese as Leander Cephas Whitlock; Greg Antonacci as Johnny Torrio; Kevin O'Rourke as Mayor Edward L. Bader; Robert Clohessy as Alderman Jim Neary; William Hill as Alderman George O'Neill; Victor Verhaeghe as Ward Boss Damien Fleming; Glenn Fleshler as George Remus; Bill Sage as Solomon Bishop; Enid Graham as Rose Van Alden

Episode chronology
← Previous "A Return to Normalcy"	Next → "Ourselves Alone"

"21" is the first episode of the second season of the HBO television series Boardwalk Empire, which originally aired September 25, 2011. The episode was written by series creator and executive producer Terence Winter and directed by executive producer Tim Van Patten.

== Plot ==
Nucky Thompson's power is challenged by the alliance of Jimmy Darmody, Eli Thompson, and the Commodore, who manipulate the Ku Klux Klan into attacking Chalky White's bootlegging warehouse. Chalky kills one of the attackers, sparking outrage in the community. Nucky orders Eli to arrest Chalky for his own protection. Jimmy reflects upon his upbringing, and Nucky's part in it. Nucky deduces that Jimmy is in league with the Commodore, and subtly warns him to carefully consider his position. Nelson Van Alden's wife Rose visits for the weekend and is dismayed by the depravity of the city. Van Alden conducts a police raid in her presence, inspiring her admiration. Meanwhile, Van Alden has a financial arrangement with Lucy to carry a child for him. While Margaret Schroeder takes her children to see The Kid, Nucky is arrested for election fraud.

== First appearances ==
- George "Solomon" Bishop: A corrupt Deputy US Attorney tasked with arresting Nucky Thompson for election fraud and taking his case to the State Court.
- Lenore White: Chalky White's wife and Lester, Maybelle and Adeline's mother.
- Lester White: Chalky and Lenore White's son, Maybelle and Adeline's older brother, a talented pianist and an upcoming alumuni of Morehouse College.
- Katy: One of Nucky and Margaret's housemaids who later becomes Owen Sleater's lover.
- Clarkson: An FBI Agent, Sawicki's partner and best friend and Van Alden's junior.
- Stan Sawicki: A Polish-American FBI Agent who's Clarkson's partner and Van Alden's junior and who is secretly also working as a corrupt agent for Nucky.
- Leander Cephas Whitlock: Commodore Kaestner's longtime lawyer who assists and mentors Jimmy and Gillian and has also known Nucky for many years preceding.
- George Remus: An Ohio-based medicinal alcohol bootlegger who also owns a pharmaceutical empire over there, is connected to the mafia underworld and is also part of the "Ohio Gang" with Harry Daugherty, Jess Smith and Warren G. Harding.

== Deaths ==
- Walker: One of Chalky White's employees and workers helping him move his bootlegging crates. He has his throat slit by the KKK.
- Orville: Another of Chalky White's employees and workers helping him move his bootlegging crates. He is shot to death when Chalky's warehouse is attacked by the KKK.
- 2 Chalky White Employees: They both are shot to death by the KKK when they attack Chalky's warehouse.
- Herman Dacus: The leader of the KKK who, alongside the other members, attacks Chalky's warehouse and is shot in the head and killed by Chalky whilst running away from the warehouse after attacking it.

== Reception ==
=== Critical reception ===
IGN gave the episode a score of 9 out of 10, saying that "... Season 1's finale promised a series ready to raise the bar. Judging by this episode, Season 2 looks primed to succeed at satisfying that promise." They continued by praising the "masterfully shot" speech Nucky gives to two different sides of the racial conflict.

=== Ratings ===
The second-season premiere was watched by 2.912 million viewers, down 39% from the pilot and down 12% from its first-season finale.
