= Hello Carter =

- Film poster
- Directed by: Anthony Wilcox
- Screenplay by: Anthony Wilcox
- Based on: Hello Carter by Anthony Wilcox
- Produced by: Julian Bird; Fiona Neilson
- Starring: Charlie Cox; Jodie Whittaker
- Cinematography: Andrew Dunn
- Edited by: Dan Farrell
- Music by: Andrew Raiher
- Production company: Revolution Films
- Distributed by: Signature Entertainment
- Release date: 4 October 2013
- Running time: 80 minutes
- Country: United Kingdom
- Language: English

Hello Carter is a 2013 British comedy-drama film written and directed by Anthony Wilcox and starring Charlie Cox and Jodie Whittaker. The film is based on Wilcox's 2011 short film of the same name. It is also Wilcox's directorial debut.

== Plot ==
Down-on-his-luck Carter has recently become homeless, single and unemployed. Desperate to win back his ex-girlfriend, he goes off on an adventure throughout London to find her, picking up some odd helpers along the way.

== Cast ==
- Charlie Cox as Carter
- Jodie Whittaker as Jenny
- Paul Schneider as Aaron
- Christian Cooke as Eliott
- Laura Donnelly as Tara
- Henry Lloyd-Hughes as Nicholas Renfrew
- Judy Parfitt as Aunt Miriam
- Antonia Thomas as Mischa
- Annabelle Wallis as Kelly

== Reception ==
On review aggregation website Rotten Tomatoes, the film holds an approval rating of 29% based on 7 reviews, with an average rating of 4/10. Film critics James Luxford of Radio Times, Kathryn Bromwich of Time Out and Catherine Shoard of The Guardian all gave it two stars out of five.
