= Bathsheba Doran =

British dramatist and playwright

- Born: England, UK
- Education: Sidney Sussex College, Cambridge (BA, MA); University of Oxford (MA); Columbia University (MFA); Juilliard School (GrDip)
- Occupations: Playwright, TV scriptwriter
- Relatives: Susan Doran (mother)

Bathsheba Sarah Lee "Bash" Doran is a British-born playwright and TV scriptwriter living in New York City.

== Life & Education ==
Bathsheba Doran, nicknamed "Bash", grew up in London. Her mother is the Elizabethan historian Susan Doran. She became interested in comedy and writing early on. Doran says she fell in love with theatre when she found Peter Pan's shadow backstage at a theatre when she was a little girl and realised that it was made of pantyhose.

Doran studied at Sidney Sussex College, Cambridge where she received a B.A. and M.A. in English literature. She went on to study at the University of Oxford where she earned another M.A.

In 2000, Doran moved to the United States on a Fulbright Scholarship. She studied and received a Master of Fine Arts from Columbia University in 2003, and was selected as a playwriting fellow at Juilliard School.

== Career ==
Doran was a contemporary of Robert Webb and David Mitchell. Her first job as a professional writer was comedy sketch writing for their BBC2 show Bruiser. She worked for several years in London as a comedy writer, writing for shows such as Smack the Pony and TV to Go.

Doran's work has been developed by the O'Neill Playwriting Center, Lincoln Center, Manhattan Theatre Club and Sundance Theatre Lab, among others. She helped Lear deBessonet with her play transFigures. She has had plays commissioned by the Atlantic Theater Company and Playwrights Horizons.

Doran's play, Kin, described as "exquisitely wrought" by the New York Times, premiered at off-Broadway's Playwrights Horizons from 25 February – 3 April 2011, under the direction of Sam Gold.

Her play The Mystery of Love and Sex, directed by Sam Gold, opened at Lincoln Center in New York on 2 March 2015. It was described as "perfectly wonderful" by the New York Times.

The play was subsequently produced at the Mark Taper Forum in Los Angeles and the Signature Theater, Arlington VA, among other national and international venues.

Doran was nominated for a 2012 Writers Guild Award for her work on the HBO series Boardwalk Empire. She also wrote episodes for season 2 of the NBC show Smash. She was a writer and co-producer of season 2 of the Showtime show Masters of Sex. She was co-executive producer and writer of Hulu's adaptation of The Looming Tower.

She co-wrote the Netflix feature film Outlaw King, starring Chris Pine and directed by David Mackenzie.

She created and wrote the Channel 4 show Traitors (originally named Jerusalem). Most recently, she signed an overall deal with Paramount Television Studios.

== Personal life ==
She lives with her wife, Katie, and two children in Brooklyn, New York.

== Awards ==
- 2013 winner of first annual Berwin Lee Playwright Awards
- 2009 recipient of the Helen Merrill Playwriting Award
- Cherry Lane Mentor Project fellow
- 2005–06 Susan Smith Blackburn Awards finalist
- Liberace Playwriting Fellowship
- Howard Stein Scholarship
- Three Lecomte de Nouy playwriting awards.

== Works ==
- Feminine Wash, Edinburgh Festival Fringe
- Until Morning, BBC Radio 4
- The Blind, Classic Stage Company, 2005
- Peer Gynt, Riverside Theatre
- Great Expectations, Lucille Lortel Theatre, 2006
- Living Room in Africa, 2006, Edge Theater, New York
- Time / Unstuck, Red Room, NY, 2006
- 2 Soldiers: The Red Room, NY, 2006
- Nest, Signature Theatre, 2007
- Nowhere in America, Keen Teens at The Kirk Theatre, 2008
- The Parent's Evening, The Flea, 2010
- Kin, Playwrights Horizons, 2011
- The Mystery of Love and Sex, Lincoln Center for the Performing Arts, 2015

== Television writing credits ==
- Bruiser (Additional material)
- TV to Go (One episode)
- Smack the Pony (Additional material)
- Best Week Ever (Season 2; five episodes)
- Smash (Season 2; two episodes)
- Boardwalk Empire (Season 2; two episodes)
- Masters of Sex (Season 2; two episodes)
- Traitors (Miniseries; four episodes; also credited as series creator)
- The Looming Tower (Miniseries; two episodes)
- Life After Life (Miniseries; four episodes; also credited as series creator)

== Bibliography ==
- The Oberon Anthology of Contemporary American Plays: Volume One. Oberon Books. 2012. ISBN 978-1849431538.
- Kin. Dramatist's Play Service. 2012. ISBN 978-0822225614.
- Living Room in Africa, Samuel French Ltd., 2008 ISBN 978-0-573-66345-1
- Nest, Samuel French, 2008 ISBN 978-0-573-66356-7
- Great Expectations, Playscripts, Inc., 2006
- Brown, Kent R., ed. (2005). "Film Noir". 35 in 10: Thirty-Five Ten-Minute Plays. Dramatic Publishing. ISBN 978-1-58342-283-0.
- Great Expectations (A Play). Playscripts. 2006. ASIN B002O9B19E.
- The Back Stage Book of New American Short Plays 2005. Back Stage Books. 2004. ISBN 978-0823088089.
- The Mystery of Love and Sex, Samuel French Ltd., 2015 ISBN 9780573704543
- The Marriage Plays , Oberon Books, 2016 ISBN 9781783197590
