= Kevin O'Rourke (actor) =

American actor (born 1956)

- Born: January 25, 1956 (age 70); Portland, Oregon, U.S.
- Education: Williams College (BA)
- Occupation: Actor
- Years active: 1981–present

Kevin O'Rourke (born January 25, 1956) is an American film, stage, and television actor, best known for his role as Scott Sherwood in Remember WENN (1996–1998), Edward Bader in Boardwalk Empire, and as Spencer Tracy in The Aviator.

== Early life and education ==
Kevin O'Rourke was born January 25, 1956, in Portland, Oregon, and raised in Tacoma, Washington. He graduated from Williams College with a Bachelor of Arts degree in theatre.

== Career ==
O'Rourke made his film debut in The Dark End of the Street (1981), and had supporting roles in Tattoo (1981) and Vice Versa (1988). From 1996 to 1998, he starred as Scott Sherwood on the series Remember WENN. After the conclusion of the series, he starred as Roy Mason in the television remake of Rear Window (1998). He also featured in one episode of The Sopranos' first season as soccer coach Don Hauser.

In 2004, he had a minor role as Spencer Tracy in Martin Scorsese's The Aviator, and later appeared on the soap opera One Life to Live from Stan Lowell from 2008 to 2010. In 2010, he was cast as Edward L. Bader in the series Boardwalk Empire, which earned him a Screen Actors Guild Award for Outstanding Performance by an Ensemble in a Drama Series.

O'Rourke founded the Williams College Summer Theatre Lab in 2005, serving as its artistic director for a decade.

== Filmography ==
=== Film ===
Year	Title	Role	Notes	Ref.
1981	The Dark End of the Street	Foreman		
1981	Tattoo	Texan		
1987	The Bedroom Window	Policeman #1		
1988	Gandahar	Metal Man	Voice; English version	
1988	Vice Versa	Brad		
1991	Ironclads	Lt. Joe Smith Jr.	Television film	
1991	The Julie Show	Tony Barnow	Television film	
1991	With Murder in Mind	Ted Sloan	Television film	
1997	Turbulence	Mark Pavone		
1998	Rear Window	Roy Mason	Television film	
1999	Deep in My Heart	Bob Cummins	Television film	
2001	Riding in Cars with Boys	Jail Ward		
2004	The Aviator	Spencer Tracy		
2015	Freeheld	Dan Wickery		
2017	Imitation Girl	Larry		
2019	The Irishman	John McCullough		
2020	An American Pickle	Dane Brunt		

=== Television ===
Year	Title	Role	Notes	Ref.
1984	Search for Tomorrow	Stephen Teichman	2 episodes	
1986	Kate & Allie	Arnie	Episode: "Too Late to Rebel"	
1991	Law & Order	Kevin Donavan	Episode: "Life Choice"	
1994	Law & Order	Marty Willick	Episode: "Precious"	
1996–1998	Remember WENN	Scott Sherwood	34 episodes	
1997	Law & Order	Deputy District Attorney Jerry Weiss	Episode: "Turnaround"	
1998	New York Undercover	Tanner	Episode: "Quid Pro Quo"	
1999	The Sopranos	Coach Don Hauser	Episode: "Boca"	
1999	Law & Order	Detective O'Malley	Episode: "Patsy"	
2000–2001	Law & Order: Special Victims Unit	Defense Attorney Sam Tiffany	2 episodes	
2004–2010	Law & Order	Defense Attorney Stan Malloy	4 episodes	
2008	Cashmere Mafia	Peter Johnson	Episode: "Pilot"	
2008–2010	One Life to Live	Stan Lowell	33 episodes	
2009	Damages	S.A.C. Don McGraff	2 episodes	
2010	The Good Wife	Martin Knox	Episode: "Bang"	
2010–2013	Boardwalk Empire	Edward L. Bader	33 episodes Screen Actors Guild Award for Outstanding Performance by an Ensemble in a Drama Series	
2011–2013	Blue Bloods	Monsignor Walter Donahue	4 episodes	
2012	Unforgettable	Jack Feeney	Episode: "Butterfly Effect"	
2013	Person of Interest	Special Operations Psychologist	Episode: "The Devil's Share"	
2014	Veep	Blake Stewart	2 episodes	
2015	Elementary	Deputy Commissioner Pat	Episode: "Absconded"	
2015–2018	Madam Secretary	Chip Harding	2 episodes	
2016	Law & Order: Special Victims Unit	Dr. Rosenthal	Episode: "Heartfelt Passages"	
2016	Outsiders	Sheriff Tom Weinike	5 episodes	
2017	Law & Order: Special Victims Unit	Dan Hewitt	Episode: "Net Worth"	
2019	Law & Order: Special Victims Unit	Hal Taylor	Episode: "Plastic"	
