= Margaret Thompson =

Fictional character

- Boardwalk Empire character
- Promotional image for season 2 of Boardwalk Empire.
- First appearance: "Boardwalk Empire"
- Last appearance: "Eldorado"
- Created by: Terence Winter
- Portrayed by: Kelly Macdonald

In-universe information
- Full name: Margaret Catherine Sheila Rohan
- Gender: Female
- Occupation: Salesgirl; Housewife; Secretary
- Family: Eamonn Rohan (brother); Nuala Rohan (sister); Bethany Rohan (sister); Éilish Rohan (sister)
- Spouse: Hans Schroeder (first husband, deceased); Enoch "Nucky" Thompson
- Significant other: Owen Sleater
- Children: Theodore ("Teddy"); Emily
- Nationality: Irish

Margaret Catherine Sheila Thompson is a fictional character in the HBO crime drama series Boardwalk Empire, portrayed by Kelly Macdonald. An Irish immigrant living in 1920s Atlantic City, New Jersey, she is the mistress and eventual wife of Atlantic County treasurer and crime boss Enoch "Nucky" Thompson (Steve Buscemi).

== Fictional character biography ==
Born Margaret Catherine Sheila Rohan circa 1893 in County Kerry, Ireland, she was raised in a poor Catholic family, headed by her alcoholic father. She lived in Templenoe and was nicknamed "Peg". She becomes pregnant as a teenager by her employer's son, and her family sends her to the Magdalene asylum. Desperate to escape, she steals her brother Eamonn's (Tony Curran) inheritance and uses it to emigrate to America. She departed from Galway aboard the SS Haverford on 27 September 1909 and landed in America on October 12. She miscarried during the voyage.

Some time afterwards, she married Hans Schroeder (Joseph Sikora), with whom she had two children, Teddy and Emily. Schroeder is an abusive alcoholic who beats her, which motivates her to join the Woman's Christian Temperance League and campaign for the passage of the Volstead Act, which ushers in Prohibition.

=== Season one ===
In the pilot episode, Margaret is pregnant with her third child. Fearing that Hans will drink their family into poverty, she goes to Nucky and asks him to give Hans a job. Nucky is immediately taken with her and promises to help, and gives her some money. Hans finds the money, gambles it away, and subsequently beats her so badly that she has a miscarriage. Nucky is furious when he finds out what happened, and decides to have Hans killed. Nucky's brother Eli (Shea Whigham) and his deputy Ray Halloran (Adam Mucci) abduct Hans off the street and take him out to sea in a boat, whereupon they beat him to death and dump his body in the ocean. When it is recovered the following day by fishermen, he is posthumously framed for a hijacking committed by Nucky's protégé Jimmy Darmody (Michael Pitt) and Al Capone (Stephen Graham). After Margaret recovers, Nucky gets her a job as a salesgirl at La Belle Femme, a dress shop in the Ritz-Carlton. Margaret and Nucky become close, with Nucky particularly impressed by her willingness to stand up to his associate Senator Walter Edge (Geoff Pierson) during a discussion about women's suffrage.

One night, Margaret notices Nucky's alderman Jim Neary (Robert Clohessy) supervising the unloading of a beer truck at a garage near her house and, when Nucky brushes aside her request for help to the Temperance League, takes this information to Prohibition officer Nelson Van Alden (Michael Shannon), who has been investigating Nucky. When Van Alden subsequently shuts down a gathering of Irish bigwigs on Margaret's information, Nucky is struck by her vindictiveness and realizes that as a woman willing to sleep with men to get ahead, he wants her as his own. They become lovers and Margaret soon finds herself housed in a den of fellow concubines. Following a tense exchange at the boutique with Nucky's former mistress, Lucy Danziger (Paz de la Huerta), Margaret quits her job.

Margaret enjoys her newfound affluence and appreciates having a father figure for her children, but is troubled by Nucky's corruption. One night, when Eli is critically wounded during a robbery of one of Nucky's illegal casinos by the D'Alessio brothers, Nucky (away in Chicago at the time) asks Margaret to retrieve a ledger from a safe in his office; the ledger details Nucky's profits from bootlegging. Shortly thereafter, she is walking with Nucky on the boardwalk when two of the D'Alessios attempt to assassinate him. When his butler Eddie Kessler (Anthony Laciura) deflects the would-be shooter's gun away from Nucky, the gun goes off and hits another woman in the shoulder, who collapses onto Margaret, the blood staining Margaret's new dress.

A few days later, Van Alden visits Margaret at her home and tells her that Nucky had her husband killed, and that she is risking her soul by being with him. This revelation leaves her unsure of Nucky's true feelings for her; her doubts grow worse when she realizes that he is using her connection to the Temperance League to shore up political support among female voters, and sees him talking to a former mistress. She ends the relationship after she and Nucky have an intense argument, in which he tacitly admits to having her husband killed.

Margaret learns that, years before, Nucky's infant son had died of pneumonia and that his wife had committed suicide. She meets with him and expresses her sympathy, and he tells her that his time with her and the children had been the happiest of his life. Moved by Nucky's sincerity – and realizing that her family would likely starve without his support – Margaret renews the relationship, and rings in the new year at his side.

=== Season two ===
A few months later, Margaret and her children are living with Nucky in a palatial house in Margate, New Jersey. Nucky has informally adopted Teddy and Emily, asking them to call him Dad. Their idyll is threatened when Nucky is arrested for electoral fraud, with bribery and murder charges on the horizon. Margaret goes to Nucky's office, which is being searched by the New Jersey State Police, and steals the incriminating ledger to protect Nucky. She also accepts temporary guardianship of his real estate holdings to keep it out of the government's reach. When Nucky and Eli get into a violent argument at Nucky's house, Margaret forces Eli out at gunpoint.

Margaret learns that her brother and sisters are living in Brooklyn. She visits and tries to reconnect with them, but her brother forbids her to contact them again. She returns home deeply depressed, and sleeps with Nucky's right-hand man Owen Sleater (Charlie Cox) to numb the pain.

When Emily contracts polio, Margaret blames herself, believing that her daughter's illness is divine retribution. She is subpoenaed by Assistant US Attorney Esther Randolph (Julianne Nicholson) to testify against Nucky, and considers doing so to atone for her sins, even if it means sending Nucky to the electric chair. Nucky tells her that he wants to marry her and become a better man, while admitting that the marriage would benefit him by making her ineligible to testify against him. She is unsure of what to do until she sees him teaching Emily to walk in her leg braces; she realizes that he loves her and her children, and marries him the following day after making a full confession to her parish priest. Her protection from testifying – and the sudden murders of the witnesses against Nucky – destroys Randolph's case, and the US Attorney's Office is forced to drop the charges.

The next morning at breakfast, Nucky tells her that he had "run into" Jimmy, with whom he had been feuding, and reconciled with him. When he tells her that Jimmy had re-enlisted in the Army, Margaret reads between the lines and realizes that Nucky personally killed him. To punish him, Margaret deeds the real estate Nucky had given her – which he had planned to use for a lucrative construction deal – to her parish.

=== Season three ===
By the third season, set 16 months later, Margaret and Nucky's marriage has fallen apart; the rare occasions in which they spend time together are spent arguing. The already tense situation worsens when Margaret sees Nucky with his mistress, Billie Kent (Meg Chambers Steedle). When she, Nucky and the children spend Easter Sunday with Eli and his family, she confides in her sister-in-law June (Nisi Sturgis) that she is unhappy.

Margaret busies herself with philanthropic causes, having funded an entire new wing of a hospital with the land she donated to the church. When one patient miscarries right in front of her, Margaret appeals to the chief of medicine to provide better prenatal care, but he dismisses her concerns. She shows him up in front of the Bishop in charge of the Catholic hospital, and forces the chief of medicine to set up a class on reproductive health. However, Margaret faces difficulty from the head nun, who tries to censor the information the doctor teaching the class gives to patients. Ultimately, the hospital board orders the classes cancelled.

Nucky's war with New York gangster Gyp Rosetti (Bobby Cannavale) and an impending indictment from the Attorney General's Office frequently keep him away from home, and he tells Owen to watch over Margaret and the children. She and Owen renew their affair, and he tells her that he wants to run away with her. When Margaret learns that she is pregnant with Owen's child, she tells him she will leave with him when the time is right. Soon afterward, however, Nucky sends Owen to New York in an attempt to kill Rosetti's boss, Joe Masseria (Ivo Nandi). The hit fails and Owen's dead body is shipped back to Nucky's hotel suite in a box. Margaret bursts into tears at the sight of Owen's body, leading Nucky to realize the affair the two had been having, but nevertheless arranges for her and the children to hide from Masseria's men.

Margaret leaves Atlantic City with the children and moves to Brooklyn under her maiden name. There, she has an abortion. Nucky tracks her down and tries to convince her to come back home where they can have a fresh start. Margaret declines his offer, and refuses to accept any money from him.

=== Season four ===
By season four, set in 1924, Margaret is working as a secretary in an investment office. She earns extra money by helping her boss trick customers into investing in worthless properties. She has an awkward reunion with Nucky, who gives her a present for Teddy and tells her that his butler Eddie has committed suicide. She is badly shaken to find Nucky's associate Arnold Rothstein (Michael Stuhlbarg) in her boss' office, investing under another name. He pays her $100 to keep quiet. When Rothstein learns that Margaret's boss is conning him, he arranges to set her up in a new apartment in return for inside information on the deal.

=== Season five ===
Season five opens in 1931, with Margaret still working at the investment office, which has been hit hard by the Great Depression. After her boss commits suicide, the company's owners find evidence of her deal with Rothstein, putting her job in jeopardy. She goes to Rothstein's widow, Carolyn (Shae D'lyn), to ask for help; Carolyn instead threatens to publicly reveal Margaret's ties to Nucky unless she gives her the profits from Rothstein's illegal stock trade. Desperate, Margaret goes to see Nucky for the first time in years. He agrees to help, but she suspects that he is up to something. Sure enough, Nucky gives her the money to pay Carolyn off – on the condition that she set up an account for him for use in driving down the stock price of a competitor, Mayflower Grain Inc. When Mayflower's stock plunges, one of the firm's partners, Joseph Kennedy (Matt Letscher), shows up at her office demanding answers. She advises Kennedy to short sell the stock, thus making a huge profit for himself and Nucky. Impressed, Kennedy gives her a share of the profits and offers to start a partnership with her. Newly rich, she meets one last time with Nucky, slow dancing with him as they say goodbye.

== Critical recognition ==
In 2011, Macdonald and the rest of the cast of Boardwalk Empire were awarded the Screen Actors Guild Award for Outstanding Performance by an Ensemble in a Drama Series.
