= Charlie Cox =

British actor (born 1982)

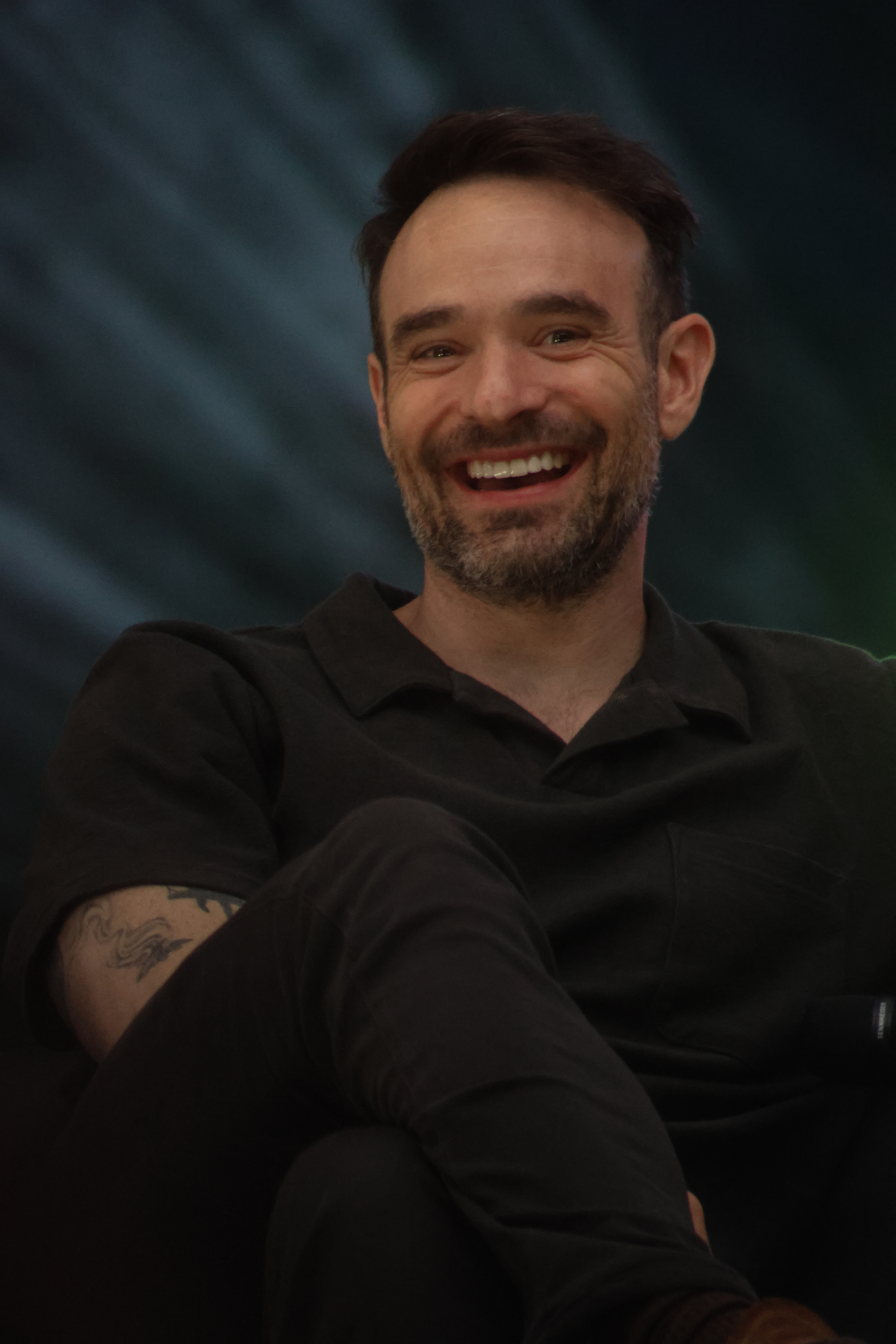
- Cox at MCM Birmingham 2026
- Born: Charlie Thomas Cox; 15 December 1982 (age 43); London, England
- Education: Bristol Old Vic Theatre School
- Occupation: Actor
- Years active: 2002–present
- Known for: Daredevil; Boardwalk Empire; Stardust; The Theory of Everything
- Spouse: Samantha Thomas (m. 2018)
- Children: 2

Charlie Thomas Cox (born 15 December 1982) is an English actor. He is known for portraying Matt Murdock / Daredevil in the Marvel Cinematic Universe since 2015, including in the television series Daredevil (2015–2018) and Daredevil: Born Again (2025–present).

Cox portrayed Owen Sleater in the second and third seasons of HBO's Boardwalk Empire (2011–2012) and Jonathan Hellyer Jones in the 2014 film The Theory of Everything. More recently, he starred in the RTÉ drama series Kin (2021–2023) and the Netflix spy miniseries Treason (2022). Cox's breakout role was as Tristan Thorn in the 2007 fantasy film Stardust, one of a series of roles he had in predominantly British productions during the first decade of his career. He made his West End debut the following year in a revival of the Harold Pinter plays The Lover and The Collection. Following his successes on-screen in the 2010s, he acted in a 2019 stage production of Harold Pinter's Betrayal, first in the West End and then on Broadway. He made his video game debut in 2025 as Gustave in Clair Obscur: Expedition 33.

== Early life ==
Cox was born in London, England, and raised in East Sussex. He is the son of Patricia (née Harley) and Andrew Frederick Seaforth Cox, a publisher. He is the youngest of five children and has one brother and three half-siblings from his father's first marriage.

Cox was raised Catholic and was educated at two private boarding schools: Ashdown House School in the village of Forest Row in East Sussex and Sherborne School in the market town of Sherborne in Dorset. Growing up, Cox did not consider a career in acting and only seriously considered it during his last few years of school. After graduating from Sherborne in 2001, he moved to London and began training at the Bristol Old Vic Theatre School the following year.

== Career ==
=== Early career and breakout in Stardust (2002–2007) ===
Cox was cast in his first professional role at age eighteen in the psychological thriller Dot the i, released in 2003. Following filming, he enrolled at the Bristol Old Vic Theatre School. In the summer following his first year of study, He was cast as Lorenzo in the 2004 Al Pacino-vehicle The Merchant of Venice, breaking the school's policy of not allowing students to audition for outside productions. Subsequently, he decided not to return to school and continued working, appearing in guest spots on TV and supporting roles in movies like the 2005 historical drama Casanova and the 2006 BBC sci-fi film A for Andromeda.

Cox's breakout role was as the main protagonist, Tristan Thorn, in the 2007 fantasy film Stardust, in which he starred opposite Claire Danes. The film was successful with both critics and audiences globally and introduced Cox to a wider audience.

=== Boardwalk Empire, The Theory of Everything and West End debut (2008–2014) ===
In 2008, Cox made his West End debut in Harold Pinter's The Lover/The Collection at the Ambassadors Theatre in London. It began previews on 15 January 2008 and opened on 29 January.

He was next seen in the 2008 film Stone of Destiny as Ian Hamilton and in the 2009 historical drama Glorious 39, which were widely released in the United Kingdom. In 2010 he had the title role in Heinrich von Kleist's The Prince of Homburg at the Donmar Warehouse in London. In September of that year, he played the closeted gay Duke of Crowborough in the first episode of the ITV drama series Downton Abbey. In 2011 he played St. Josemaría Escrivá in the Roland Joffé film There Be Dragons and Ishmael in Encore's Moby Dick miniseries.

Also in 2011, he signed on for a recurring role in the second season of the Martin Scorsese-produced HBO original series Boardwalk Empire as Owen Sleater, an Irish enforcer with ties to the IRA. His character became a regular for the series' third season, broadcast in September 2012. He received a Screen Actors Guild Award as part of the ensemble in 2011 and another nomination the following year.

In 2013 he starred in the independent film Hello Carter and the BBC Cold War thriller Legacy. He had lead roles in two unproduced CBS TV pilots: a political drama titled The Ordained in February 2013 and an untitled Wall Street show executive-produced by John Cusack in February 2014. At the end of 2013, production began on the film The Theory of Everything, where Cox portrays Jonathan Hellyer Jones, the second husband of Jane Hawking. The film premiered at the Toronto International Film Festival in September 2014 and was nominated for Best Picture at the 2015 Academy Awards.

=== Daredevil (2015–2018) ===
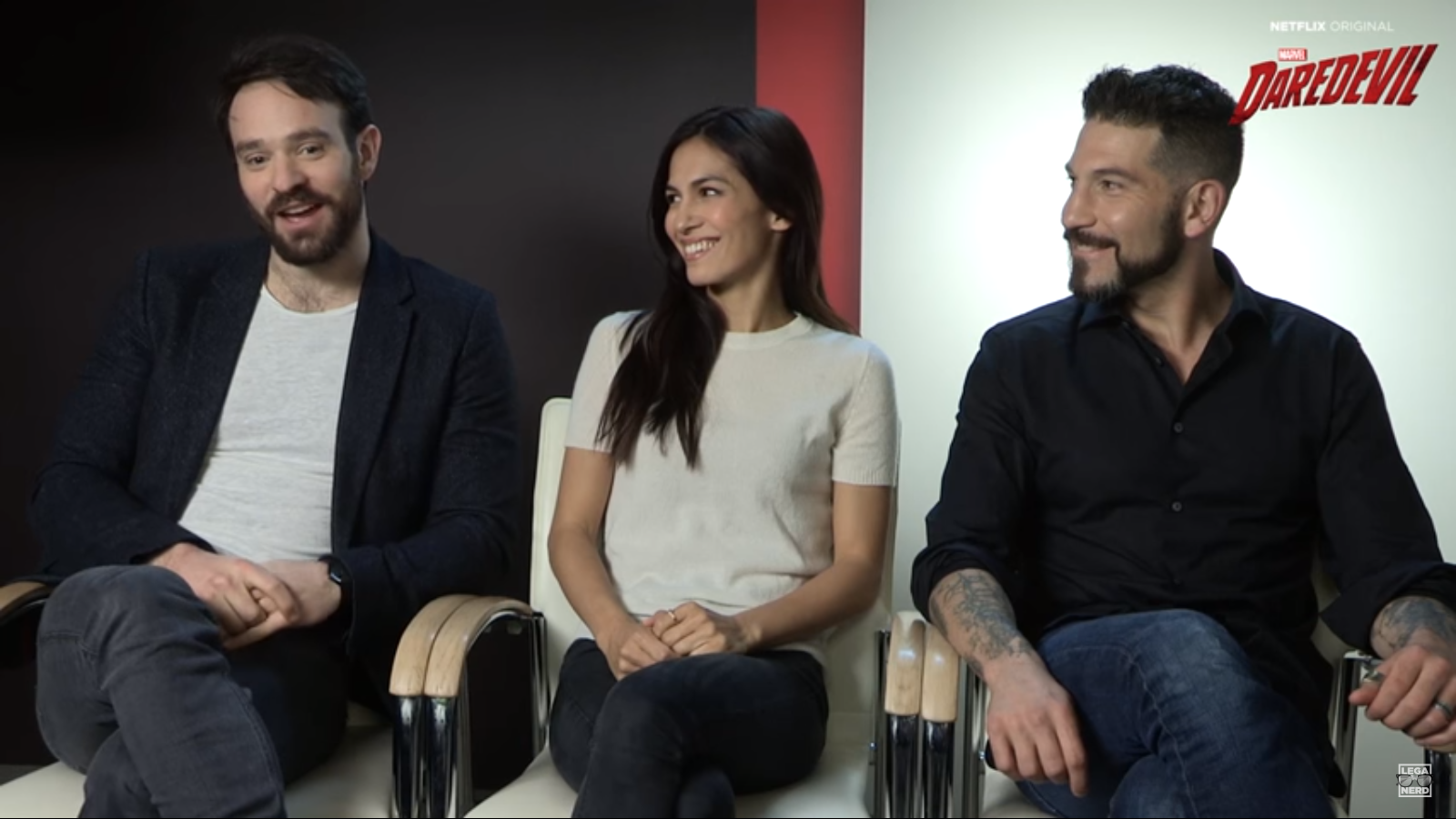
Cox with Daredevil castmates Élodie Yung and Jon Bernthal in 2016

Cox portrayed Matt Murdock in Marvel's Daredevil TV series as well as the 2017 team-up miniseries event The Defenders, produced and released through Netflix. His performance was praised and given a Helen Keller Achievement Award for his role by the American Foundation for the Blind.

It was announced that Cox had won the role in May 2014, and later reported that Marvel had considered him for it since 2012. Production on the first season began in summer 2014, and it premiered on Netflix in April 2015. It ran for three seasons and was produced over four years, concluding in late 2018. In the following years, Cox shared his interest in reprising the role in a future project, also noting his contractual obligations by Marvel Studios to do so.

Between filming seasons of Daredevil, Cox made his New York theater debut, co-starring in the off-Broadway production of Incognito at the Manhattan Theatre Club. In late 2017 it was announced that he had joined the cast of Stripped, a thriller produced by Lorenzo di Bonaventura, who also produced Cox's breakout film Stardust, but it was never produced. He also acted opposite Michael Caine, Jim Broadbent, Ray Winstone, and others in the 2018 film King of Thieves, based on the true story of the 2015 Hatton Garden jewelry heist in London; it reunited him with James Marsh, who directed him in 2014's The Theory of Everything.

=== New projects and Broadway debut (2019–2021) ===
After Daredevil abruptly ended, Cox took the opportunity to star opposite Tom Hiddleston and Zawe Ashton in the West End production of Harold Pinter's Betrayal, which opened on 14 March 2019 and closed on 8 June. Cox was sought for the role by director Jamie Lloyd, who had previously directed him in the 2008 production of the Pinter play The Lover and The Collection. Betrayal transferred to Broadway with the original cast for a 17-week limited engagement, beginning previews on 14 August and closing on 8 December 2019.

During this period, Cox also took part in some of his friends' projects; in late 2018 he acted in the short film The Knot, directed by Daredevil and The Defenders script supervisor Rebecca Schwab, and in a 2019 episode of Daredevil costar Deborah Ann Woll's Dungeons & Dragons internet show Relics and Rarities.

In fall 2020, Cox began filming the RTÉ Dublin crime series Kin, in which he stars with Aidan Gillen, Clare Dunne, Maria Doyle Kennedy, Ciarán Hinds, and Emmett Scanlan. The eight-part series was released on 9 September 2021, on AMC+ in the US and Canada, and on 12 September 2021, on RTE in Ireland. The show's second season was broadcast in 2023.

=== Return to Daredevil (2022–present) ===
In December 2021, Marvel Studios president Kevin Feige confirmed that Cox would be reprising the role of Daredevil in the studio's Marvel Cinematic Universe (MCU) productions; his first project "remain[ed] to be seen" at that time. The first Marvel Studios production he appeared in was Spider-Man: No Way Home (2021), in which Matt Murdock gives legal advice to Peter Parker for ostensibly murdering Mysterio. In July 2022, he was confirmed to be reprising the role in the Disney+ television series She-Hulk: Attorney at Law (2022) and Echo (2024). In 2025, he starred in his own revival series Daredevil: Born Again (2025–present) and additionally lent his voice to the character in the animated series Your Friendly Neighborhood Spider-Man. In August 2024, Feige confirmed Daredevil: Born Again was renewed for a second season, with Cox confirming filming will start by March 2025. Filming wrapped in July of that same year and the season premiered in March 2026. Cox and co-star Vincent D’Onofrio were credited as executive producers for Daredevil: Born Again season two. Producer Brad Winderbaum confirmed a third season was in development in September 2025, with filming lasting from March to July 2026.

Cox also starred in the British spy drama miniseries Treason, which premiered on Netflix on 26 December 2022, and the French-developed video game Clair Obscur: Expedition 33 as Gustave. His performance in Expedition 33 received acclaim, and was nominated for the "Best Performance" award at The Game Awards 2025.

From December 2026 to February 2027, Cox is set to lead the cast of the world premiere of The King's Ransom as Vince at the Donmar Warehouse in London.

== Personal life ==
In September 2018, Cox married television producer Samantha Thomas, with whom he has a daughter and a son. At the time of their wedding, they both worked for Marvel Television, where Thomas was Vice President of Original Programming and Cox starred in Daredevil. Subsequently, Thomas was the Executive Vice President of BRON Studios's television division; during her tenure, she and Cox collaborated on the crime drama series Kin. The family lives in Connecticut. Cox has previously lived in New York City, Los Angeles, and in the Chelsea and Highbury neighbourhoods of London. In January 2025, Cox became an American citizen through naturalisation, making him a dual citizen of the UK and US.

During the late 2000s in Los Angeles, Cox was part of a close group of friends that included British and Irish actors Eddie Redmayne, Andrew Garfield, Jamie Dornan, and Robert Pattinson, among others. He is a football fan and supports Arsenal F.C.

== Filmography ==
=== Film ===
Year	Title	Role	Notes
2003	Dot the i	Theo	
2004	The Merchant of Venice	Lorenzo	
2005	Things to Do Before You're 30	Danny	
2005	Casanova	Giovanni Bruni	
2006	The Maidens' Conspiracy	Diafebus	
2007	Stardust	Tristan Thorn	
2008	Stone of Destiny	Ian Hamilton	
2009	Glorious 39	Lawrence	
2011	There Be Dragons	Josemaría Escrivá	
2012	A Sunny Morning	Adam	Short film
2013	Hello Carter	Carter	
2014	The Theory of Everything	Jonathan Hellyer Jones	
2017	Eat Locals	Henry	
2018	King of Thieves	Basil	
2021	Spider-Man: No Way Home	Matt Murdock / Daredevil	Cameo
2025	Merv	Russ Owens	
TBA	This Is How It Goes	Cody	Post-production
TBA	Synthetic		Post-production

=== Television ===
Year	Title	Role	Notes
2002	Judge John Deed	Young Vicar	Episode: "Everyone's Child"
2006	Lewis	Danny Griffon	Premise pilot
2006	A for Andromeda	Dennis Bridger	Television film
2010	Downton Abbey	Duke of Crowborough	Episode: "1.1"
2011	Moby Dick	Ishmael	Main role, miniseries; 2 episodes
2011–2012	Boardwalk Empire	Owen Sleater	Main role (season 3), Recurring (season 2); 23 episodes
2013	The Ordained	Tom Reilly	Unaired pilot
2013	Legacy	Charles Thoroughgood	Television film
2015–2018	Daredevil	Matt Murdock / Daredevil	Lead role; 39 episodes
2017	The Defenders	Matt Murdock / Daredevil	Main role, miniseries; 8 episodes
2019	Relics and Rarities	Seamus O'Flanagan	Episode: "The Ascent of the Angler"
2021–2023	Kin	Michael Kinsella	Main role; 16 episodes
2022	She-Hulk: Attorney at Law	Matt Murdock / Daredevil	Guest star, miniseries; 2 episodes
2022	Treason	Adam Lawrence	Main role; 5 episodes
2022–2024	Marvel Studios: Assembled	Himself	2 episodes
2024	Echo	Matt Murdock / Daredevil	Miniseries; Episode: "Chafa"
2025	Adults	Mr. Teacher / Andrew	Recurring role; 3 episodes
2025–present	Your Friendly Neighborhood Spider-Man	Matt Murdock / Daredevil	Voice role; 2 episodes
2025–2027	Daredevil: Born Again	Matt Murdock / Daredevil	Lead role; 17 episodes; also executive producer

=== Stage ===
Year	Title	Role	Venue/Company	Dates	Notes
2005	'Tis Pity She's a Whore	Giovanni	Southwark Playhouse	28 September – 22 October 2005	London production
2008	The Lover/The Collection	John/Bill	Ambassadors Theatre	15 January – 3 May 2008	West End revival
2010	The Prince of Homburg	The Prince of Homburg	Donmar Warehouse	22 July – 4 September 2010	Off-West End production
2010	The Children's Monologues	Young boy	Old Vic Theatre	14 November 2010	Off-West End production
2016	Incognito	Henry Maison, Michael Wolf, Hans Albert Einstein, Ben Murphy, Freddy Myers, Greg Barraclough	Manhattan Theatre Club	3 May – 10 July 2016	Original Off-Broadway production
2019	Betrayal	Jerry	Harold Pinter Theatre	5 March – 8 June 2019	West End revival
2019	Betrayal	Jerry	Bernard B. Jacobs Theater	14 August – 8 December 2019	Broadway transfer
2026–2027	The King's Ransom	Vince	Donmar Warehouse	5 December 2026 – 6 February 2027	Off-West End production

=== Video games ===
Year	Title	Voice role	Notes
2025	Clair Obscur: Expedition 33	Gustave	

== Awards and nominations ==
Year	Award	Category	Recipient	Result
2012	Screen Actors Guild Awards	Outstanding Performance by an Ensemble in a Drama Series	Boardwalk Empire	Won
2013	Screen Actors Guild Awards	Outstanding Performance by an Ensemble in a Drama Series	Boardwalk Empire	Nominated
2015	Screen Actors Guild Awards	Outstanding Performance by an Ensemble in a Motion Picture	The Theory of Everything	Nominated
2015	Helen Keller Achievement Awards	Honoree	Daredevil	Won
2015	IGN Summer Movie Awards	Best TV Hero	Daredevil	Nominated
2016	Saturn Awards	Best Actor in a Television Series	Daredevil	Nominated
2017	Saturn Awards	Best Actor in a Television Series	Daredevil	Nominated
2017	Lucille Lortel Awards	Outstanding Featured Actor in a Play	Incognito	Nominated
2019	Saturn Awards	Best Actor in Streaming Presentation	Daredevil	Nominated
2025	Astra TV Awards	Best Actor in a Drama Series	Daredevil: Born Again	Nominated
2025	Critics' Choice Super Awards	Best Actor in a Superhero Series, Limited Series or Made-for-TV Movie	Daredevil: Born Again	Nominated
2025	The Game Awards	Best Performance	Clair Obscur: Expedition 33	Nominated
2026	BAFTA Games Awards	Performer in a Supporting Role	Clair Obscur: Expedition 33	Nominated
