= List of Oingo Boingo members =

The following is a complete chronology of various line-ups of Oingo Boingo and The Mystic Knights of the Oingo Boingo from 1972 until 1995.

== Former members ==
Image	Name	Years active	Instruments	Release contributions
	Richard Elfman	1972–1976	lead and backing vocals; percussion	Forbidden Zone (soundtrack) (1983)
	Marie-Pascale Elfman	1972–1978	lead vocals	Forbidden Zone (soundtrack) (1983)
	Matthew Bright	1972	upright bass	Forbidden Zone (soundtrack) (1983)
	Gene Cunningham	1972–1974	rhythm guitar	Forbidden Zone (soundtrack) (1983)
	Ernie Fosselius	1972	wind instruments	None
	Dale Turner	1972–1995	trumpet; trombone; percussion; guitar; backing vocals	all Oingo Boingo releases
	Leon Schneiderman	1972–1995	baritone and alto saxophones; percussion; backing vocals	all Oingo Boingo releases
	Michael Byron	1972–1973	trumpet; percussion	None
	Terrill Maguire	1972–1973	dancer; tambourine; percussion	None
	William "Billy Superball" Folwell	1972–1976; 1977; 1978	bass; trumpet	None
	Jan Munroe	1972–1974	trumpet	Forbidden Zone (soundtrack) (1983)
	Lori Erenberg	1972–1976	accordion; lead vocals	None
	George Jay	1972–1973	trumpet	None
	Arla Dietz	1972–1973	N/A (dancer)	None
	Stan Ayeroff	1972–1974	lead and rhythm guitar	None
	William Winant	1972–1975; 1991–1992	percussion	None
	Musti Faun	1973–1975	N/A (choreographer)	None
	Todd Manley	1973–1977; 1977–1978	percussion; drums	None
	Sam "Sluggo" Phipps	1973–1995	tenor and soprano saxophones; clarinet; percussion; backing vocals; flute	all Oingo Boingo releases
	Josh Gordon	1973–1976	trumpet; sousaphone; banjar	None
	Jon Gold	1974–1975	lead and rhythm guitar	None
	Danny Elfman	1974–1995	lead and backing vocals; guitar; percussion; sitar; programming; trombone; violin	all Oingo Boingo releases
	Brad Kay	1974–1975	keyboards	Forbidden Zone (soundtrack) (1983)
	Gisele Lindley	1975	N/A (dancer)	Forbidden Zone (soundtrack) (1983)
	Steve Bartek	1975–1995	guitar; backing vocals; percussion; accordion	all Oingo Boingo releases
	Joe Berland	1975–1980	piano; keyboards; accordion	Forbidden Zone (soundtrack) (1983)
	Miriam Cutler	1976–1979	clarinet	None
	Bob Frazier	1976	trumpet	None
	Tom Pedrini	1976–1977	upright bass; trumpet; mini tuba	None
	Craig Pallett	1976	trumpet	None
	Timm Boatman	1977; 1978	drums; percussion	None
	John "Vatos" Hernandez	1978–1980; 1980–1995	drums; percussion	all Oingo Boingo releases
	Jeff Breeh	1979	bass	None
	Kerry Hatch	1979–1984	bass; bass synthesizer; percussion; backing vocals	Oingo Boingo (1980); Only a Lad (1981); Nothing to Fear (1982); Good for Your Soul (1983); So-Lo (1984); Skeletons in the Closet (1989); Stay (1990); Best O' Boingo (1991); Anthology (1999); 20th Century Masters The Millennium Collection (2002)
	Dan Schmidt	1979–1980	keyboards	Oingo Boingo (EP) (1980); Forbidden Zone (soundtrack) (1983)
	Richard Gibbs	1980–1984	keyboards; synthesizer; trombone; percussion; backing vocals	Oingo Boingo (1980); Only a Lad (1981); Nothing to Fear (1982); Good for Your Soul (1983); So-Lo (1984); Skeletons in the Closet (1989); Stay (1990); Best O' Boingo (1991); Anthology (1999); 20th Century Masters The Millennium Collection (2002)
	David Eagle	1980	drums	Oingo Boingo (EP) (1980); Urgh! A Music War (1982)
	John Avila	1984–1995	bass; bass synthesizer; percussion; accordion; backing vocals	Dead Man's Party (1985); Boi-ngo (1987); Boingo Alive (1988); Dark at the End of the Tunnel (1990); Stay (1990); Best O' Boingo (1991); Boingo (1994); Farewell (1996); Anthology (1999); 20th Century Masters The Millennium Collection (2002)
	Michael Bacich	1984–1987	keyboards; backing vocals	Dead Man's Party (1985); Boi-ngo (1987); Stay (1990); Best O' Boingo (1991); Anthology (1999); 20th Century Masters The Millennium Collection (2002)
	Carl Graves	1987–1993	keyboards; synthesizers; backing vocals; electronic percussion pad	Boingo Alive (1988); Dark at the End of the Tunnel (1990); Stay (1990); Best O' Boingo (1991); Boingo (1994) (one track: "Lost Like This"); Anthology (1999); 20th Century Masters The Millennium Collection (2002)
	Warren Fitzgerald	1993–1995	guitar	Boingo (1994); Farewell (1996); Anthology (1999)
	Doug Lacy	1993–1995	accordion; percussion; trombone	Boingo (1994); Farewell (1996); Anthology (1999)
	Marc Mann	1993–1995	keyboards; samples	Boingo (1994); Farewell (1996); Anthology (1999)

== Additional musicians ==
Image	Name	Years active	Instruments	Release contributions
	Bruce Fowler	1983–1993	trombone	Boingo Alive (1988); Dark at the End of the Tunnel (1990); Stay (1990); Best O' Boingo (1991); Anthology (1999); 20th Century Masters: The Millennium Collection (2002)
	Paul Fox	1984	synthesizers	So-Lo (1984); Best O' Boingo (1991); Anthology (1999)
	Katurah Clarke	1993–1995	percussion	Boingo (1994); Farewell: Live from the Universal Amphitheatre Halloween 1995 (1996)
	George McMullen	1995	trombone; didgeridoo	Farewell: Live from the Universal Amphitheatre Halloween 1995 (1996)

== Timeline ==
While most members played a variety of instruments and vocals, this timeline represents a member's service listed under their main instrument.
