= Oingo Boingo discography =

- Studio albums: 8
- Extended plays: 1
- Soundtrack albums: 1
- Live albums: 2
- Compilation albums: 5
- Tribute albums: 2
- Singles: 19
- Music videos: 10

The discography of Oingo Boingo, an American new wave band, consists of eight studio albums, two live albums, five compilation albums, two extended plays, one soundtrack, seventeen singles, ten music videos, and a list of soundtrack appearances.

== Albums ==
=== Studio albums ===
Year	Album details	Peak chart positions		Certifications (sales thresholds)
Year	Album details	US	AUS	Certifications (sales thresholds)
1981	Only a Lad: Released: June 19, 1981; Label: A&M; Formats: CD, LP, CS	172	—	
1982	Nothing to Fear: Released: June 22, 1982; Label: A&M; Formats: CD, LP, CS	148	—	
1983	Good for Your Soul: Released: July 26, 1983; Label: A&M; Formats: CD, LP, CS	144	—	
1984	So-Lo ^{1}: Released: November 11, 1984; Label: MCA; Format: CD, LP, CS	—	—	
1985	Dead Man's Party: Released: October 28, 1985; Label: MCA; Formats: CD, LP, CS	98	65	RIAA: Gold
1987	Boi-ngo: Released: March 2, 1987; Label: MCA; Formats: CD, LP, CS	77	98	
1990	Dark at the End of the Tunnel: Released: February 20, 1990; Label: MCA; Formats: CD, LP, CS	72	—	
1994	Boingo ^{2}: Released: May 17, 1994; Label: Giant; Formats: CD, CS	71	—	
"—" denotes a release that did not chart.

^{1} Released as a Danny Elfman solo album but often retrospectively attributed to Oingo Boingo. The original line-up plus Paul Fox performed on the album.
^{2} Released as "Boingo"

=== Live albums ===
Year	Album details
1988	Boingo Alive: Released: September 26, 1988; Label: MCA; Format: CD, LP, CS
1996	Farewell: Live from the Universal Amphitheatre, Halloween 1995: Released: April 16, 1996; Label: A&M; Format: CD, CS

=== Compilations ===
Year	Album details
1989	The Best of Oingo Boingo: Skeletons in the Closet: Released: January 10, 1989; Label: A&M; Format: CD, LP, CS
1990	Stay: Released: April 1, 1990; Label: MCA; Format: LP, CD, CS (Brazil only)
1991	Best O' Boingo: Released: September 17, 1991; Label: MCA; Format: LP, CD
1999	Anthology: Released: November 2, 1999; Label: Hip-O; Format: CD
2002	The Best of Oingo Boingo: 20th Century Masters: The Millennium Collection: Released: September 24, 2002; Label: MCA; Format: CD

=== Soundtracks ===
Year	Album details
1983	Forbidden Zone: Released: 1983; Label: Varèse Sarabande; Format: CD, LP

=== Tribute albums ===
Year	Album details
2005	Dead Bands Party: A Tribute to Oingo Boingo: Released: 2005; Label: Indianola; Format: CD
2006	Drink to Bones That Turn to Dust: A Toast to Oingo Boingo: Released: October 30, 2006; Label: Dep't of Records; Format: CD

== Extended plays ==
Year	Album details
1980	Oingo Boingo: Released: September 17, 1980; Label: I.R.S.; Format: EP

== Singles ==
Year	Title	Chart positions			Album
Year	Title	US	US Alt	AUS	Album
1976	"You Got Your Baby Back" ^{1}	—	x	—	"You Got Your Baby Back" single
1980	"Only a Lad"	—	x	—	Oingo Boingo
1981	"Only a Lad"	—	x	—	Only a Lad
1981	"Little Girls"	—	x	—	Only a Lad
1982	"Private Life"	—	x	—	Nothing to Fear
1982	"Grey Matter"	—	x	—	Nothing to Fear
1982	"Whole Day Off"	—	x	—	Nothing to Fear
1983	"Wake Up (It's 1984)"	—	x	—	Good for Your Soul
1983	"Nothing Bad Ever Happens"	—	x	—	Good for Your Soul
1983	"Good for Your Soul"	—	x	—	Good for Your Soul
1984	"Gratitude" ^{2}	—	x	—	So-Lo
1985	"Weird Science"	45	x	39	Dead Man's Party
1986	"Just Another Day"	85	x	—	Dead Man's Party
1986	"Dead Man's Party"	—	x	—	Dead Man's Party
1986	"Stay"	—	x	30	Dead Man's Party
1986	"Pain"	—	x	—	Boi-ngo
1987	"We Close Our Eyes"	—	x	—	Boi-ngo
1987	"Not My Slave"	—	x	—	Boi-ngo
1988	"Winning Side"	—	14	—	Boingo Alive
1989	"Flesh and Blood"	—	—	—	Dark at the End of the Tunnel
1990	"Out of Control"	—	—	—	Dark at the End of the Tunnel
1990	"Skin"	—	—	—	Dark at the End of the Tunnel
1990	"When the Lights Go Out"	—	15	—	Dark at the End of the Tunnel
1994	"Insanity" ^{3}	—	—	—	Boingo
1994	"Hey!" ^{3}	—	23	—	Boingo

^{1} As "The Mystic Knights of the Oingo Boingo"
^{2} As Danny Elfman
^{3} As Boingo

== Music videos ==
Year	Song	Director(s)	Album
1981	"Little Girls"	Richard Elfman	Only a Lad
1982	"Private Life"	Richard Elfman	Nothing to Fear
1983	"Nothing Bad Ever Happens"	Richard Elfman	Good for Your Soul
1984	"Gratitude"	Graeme Whifler	So-Lo
1985	"Weird Science"	—	Dead Man's Party
1986	"Just Another Day"	Stephen R. Johnson	Dead Man's Party
1986	"Dead Man's Party"	—	Dead Man's Party
1986	"Stay"	David Hogan	Dead Man's Party
1990	"Out of Control"	—	Dark at the End of the Tunnel
1994	"Insanity"	Fred Stuhr	Boingo

== Other appearances ==
This section is intended to be a compendium of the many tracks that Oingo Boingo has recorded for TV and film soundtracks, as well as various artists compilation albums. It also includes previously released songs that have been included in TV, film and other media.

Year	Song	Appearance	Notes
1979	"I'm Afraid"	L.A. In: A Collection of Los Angeles Rock and New Wave Bands compilation	The first official release to be credited to "Oingo Boingo", as opposed to "The Mystic Knights of the Oingo Boingo".
1981	"I've Got to Be Entertained"	Longshot	No official soundtrack release. Band appears in film, performing the song.
1981	"Ain't This the Life"	Urgh! A Music War! film Urgh! A Music War soundtrack	Band appears in film, performing the song. Recorded at The Whisky in Hollywood, CA on August 17, 1980. Original studio versions previously released on Oingo Boingo demo EP and Oingo Boingo EP.
1982	"Better Luck Next Time"	The Last American Virgin soundtrack	—
1982	"Goodbye, Goodbye"	Fast Times at Ridgemont High film Fast Times at Ridgemont High soundtrack	—
1984	"Wild Sex (In the Working Class)"	Sixteen Candles	No official soundtrack release; previously released on Nothing to Fear.
1984	"Something Isn't Right"	Bachelor Party soundtrack	—
1984	"Bachelor Party"	Bachelor Party soundtrack	—
1984	"Who Do You Want to Be"	Bachelor Party film	Does not appear on soundtrack; previously released on Good for Your Soul.
1984	"Hold Me Back"	Surf II	No official soundtrack release.
1984	"Only a Lad"	Surf II	No official soundtrack release; previously released on Only a Lad.
1985	"Weird Science"	Weird Science film Weird Science soundtrack	Also released as a single. A longer, different mix would later appear on Dead Man's Party.
1986	"Fast Times"	Fast Times	No official soundtrack release.
1986	"Take Your Medicine"	Live! For Life compilation	Compilation album of previously unreleased live and studio tracks with the intent of raising funds for the AMC Cancer Research Center.
1986	"Dead Man's Party"	Back to School film Back to School soundtrack	Band appears in film, performing the song. Previously released on Dead Man's Party.
1986	"No One Lives Forever"	The Texas Chainsaw Massacre 2 film The Texas Chainsaw Massacre 2 soundtrack	From Dead Man's Party.
1986	"Not My Slave"	Something Wild soundtrack	A different mix would later appear on BOI-NGO.
1987	"Home Again"	Wisdom	Does not appear on soundtrack; reissued on BOI-NGO.
1987	"Same Man I Was Before"	My Best Friend Is a Vampire	No official soundtrack release; previously released on Dead Man's Party.
1987	"Happy"	Summer School soundtrack	Credited to Danny Elfman, who also scored the film.
1987	"Who Do You Want to Be"	Teen Wolf Too film Teen Wolf Too soundtrack	From Good for Your Soul.
1987	"Not My Slave"	Like Father Like Son	No official soundtrack release; previously released on BOI-NGO.
1988	"Try to Believe"	Midnight Run film Midnight Run soundtrack	Credited to Mosley & The B-Men. Instrumental version appears in film; vocal version appears on soundtrack. A different version would later appear on Dark at the End of the Tunnel.
1989	"Flesh 'N Blood"	Ghostbusters II film Ghostbusters II soundtrack	A different mix would later appear on Dark at the End of the Tunnel.
1989	"Winning Side"	She's Out of Control soundtrack	From Boingo Alive.
1990	"Country Skin"	Nightbreed film Nightbreed soundtrack	Country & western version of "Skin", performed by Michael Stanton. Oingo Boingo version previously released on Dark at the End of the Tunnel.
1990	"Violent Love"	The Adventures of Ford Fairlane film	Does not appear on soundtrack; previously released on Oingo Boingo EP.
1992	"We Close Our Eyes"	Buffy the Vampire Slayer film Buffy the Vampire Slayer soundtrack	Performed by Susanna Hoffs. Oingo Boingo version previously released on BOI-NGO.
1993	"Weird Science"	Beavis and Butt-Head	Appears in season 2 episode "Scientific Stuff". From Dead Man's Party.
1994–1998	"Weird Science"	Weird Science TV series	Used as intro theme song. From Dead Man's Party.
1997	"No One Lives Forever"	Casper: A Spirited Beginning film Casper: A Spirited Beginning soundtrack	From Dead Man's Party.
1997	"Home Again"	Home Alone 3 film Home Alone 3 soundtrack	From BOI-NGO.
1999–2000	"Forbidden Zone"	Dilbert	Re-recorded and rearranged version used for intro theme song. No official soundtrack release; original Oingo Boingo versions previously released on Oingo Boingo demo EP and Forbidden Zone soundtrack.
2001	"Stay"	Donnie Darko: The Director's Cut film Donnie Darko soundtrack	Does not appear on original soundtrack but was included on the British two-disc reissue in 2004. From Dead Man's Party.
2005	"Capitalism"	Enron: The Smartest Guys in the Room film Enron: The Smartest Guys in the Room soundtrack	From Only a Lad.
2005	"Who Do You Want to Be"	Tony Hawk's American Wasteland; Tony Hawk's American Sk8land	From Boingo Alive.
2006	"Dead Man's Party"	NCIS	Appears in season 4 episode "Witch Hunt". From Dead Man's Party.
2006	"Dead Man's Party"	Dance Dance Revolution Ultramix 4	From Dead Man's Party.
2007	"Only a Lad"	Guitar Hero Encore: Rocks the 80s	From Only a Lad.
2009	"Weird Science"	American Idol	Appears during San Francisco auditions in season 8. From Dead Man's Party.
2011	"Weird Science"	Rock Band 3	Supplemental downloadable content for video game. From Dead Man's Party.
2015	"Weird Science"	Rick and Morty	Appears in season 2 trailer. From Dead Man's Party.
2017	"Just Another Day"	Stranger Things	Appears in season 2 episode "Madmax". From Dead Man's Party.
