= Best O' Boingo =

Greatest hits album by Oingo Boingo
- Released: September 17, 1991
- Recorded: 1984–1990
- Genre: New wave; ska
- Length: 76:51
- Label: MCA
- Producer: Danny Elfman, Steve Bartek, John Avila, Paul Ratajczak

Oingo Boingo chronology
Dark at the End of the Tunnel (1990)	Best O' Boingo (1991)	Boingo (1994)

Professional ratings
Review scores
Source	Rating
AllMusic	4/5 stars

Best O' Boingo is the second greatest hits album from American new wave band Oingo Boingo, released in 1991 by MCA Records. It features songs recorded during the band's years on MCA Records, from 1984's So-Lo through 1990's Dark at the End of the Tunnel. As such, the songs from the period when the band was on I.R.S. Records—as well as several others—are represented here by their re-recorded versions from the 1988 "live in the studio" album Boingo Alive.

== Track listing ==
All tracks are written by Danny Elfman.

No.	Title	Original release	Length
1.	"Dead Man's Party"	Boingo Alive (1988)	6:24
2.	"When the Lights Go Out"	Dark at the End of the Tunnel (1990)	4:11
3.	"Gratitude"	Danny Elfman's So-Lo (1984)	5:14
4.	"Skin"	Dark at the End of the Tunnel (1990)	4:40
5.	"Flesh 'N Blood"	Previously unreleased single remix. Originally from Dark at the End of the Tunnel (1990).	4:09
6.	"Not My Slave"	BOI-NGO (1987)	4:46
7.	"Stay"	Dead Man's Party (1985)	3:38
8.	"Sweat"	Boingo Alive (1988)	4:31
9.	"No Spill Blood"	Boingo Alive (1988)	4:34
10.	"Out of Control"	Dark at the End of the Tunnel (1990)	4:10
11.	"Weird Science"	Dead Man's Party (1985)	6:06
12.	"No One Lives Forever"	Boingo Alive (1988)	4:08
13.	"Wild Sex (in the Working Class)"	Boingo Alive (1988)	4:17
14.	"Just Another Day"	Dead Man's Party (1985)	5:14
15.	"Who Do You Want to Be"	Boingo Alive (1988)	3:21
16.	"Only a Lad"	Boingo Alive (1988)	3:50
17.	"Goodbye-Goodbye"	Boingo Alive (1988)	3:29
Total length:			76:51

== Personnel ==
Oingo Boingo

- John Avila – bass guitar, vocals
- Steve Bartek – guitars
- Danny Elfman – vocals, rhythm guitars
- Carl Graves – keyboards, vocals
- Johnny "Vatos" Hernandez – drums, percussion
- Sam Phipps – tenor and soprano saxophones
- Leon Schneiderman – baritone saxophone
- Dale Turner – trumpet, trombone

Additional musicians

- Bruce Fowler – trombone
- Mike Bacich – keyboards (tracks 7, 11)

Technical

- Danny Elfman – co-producer (tracks 1–17)
- Steve Bartek – co-producer (tracks 1–17)
- John Avila – co-producer (tracks 1–2, 4–17)
- Paul Ratajczak – co-producer (track 3)
- Bill Jackson – engineer, mixing (tracks 1, 6, 9, 13–14, 16–17)
- Mark Camins – mixing (track 3)
- Jay Burnett – mixing (track 3)
- Chris Lord-Alge – mixing (tracks 2, 4–5, 10)
- Jim Scott – mixing (tracks 8, 12, 15)
- David Leonard – mixing (track 11)
- Michael Frondelli – mixing (track 7)
- Vartan – art direction
- Sunja Park – design
- Georganne Deen – cover art, logo
