= Boingo Alive =

- Cover art designed by Georganne Deen

Live album by Oingo Boingo
- Released: September 26, 1988
- Recorded: July 1988
- Venue: Power Plant Rehearsal Studio (North Hollywood)
- Genres: New wave; ska
- Length: 128:12
- Label: MCA
- Producers: Danny Elfman, Steve Bartek

Oingo Boingo chronology
Boi-ngo (1987)	Boingo Alive (1988)	The Best of Oingo Boingo: Skeletons in the Closet (1989)

Singles from Boingo Alive
- 1. "Cinderella Undercover / Winning Side" Released: September 1988 (US)

Boingo Alive is a double album by American new wave band Oingo Boingo, released in 1988 by MCA Records. It was performed and recorded live in a rehearsal studio with no audience, with the band performing songs from previous albums and two previously unreleased songs to celebrate the 10th anniversary of the band's beginning.

== Background ==
According to the Los Angeles Times, as well as the album's sleeve sticker and promotional material, Boingo Alive was recorded live on a soundstage over nine nights in July 1988. The sticker and ads also read, "Hear our greatest hits the way they were meant to be heard—live".

After Oingo Boingo migrated from A&M Records/I.R.S. Records to MCA Records in 1984, A&M had retained ownership of the band's previous recordings, but by 1988 the band became legally able to re-record their old material. Frontman Danny Elfman stated that Boingo Alive was a project the band had been planning for years, as they had been unhappy with the sound of their studio recordings, particularly with regards to the comparative lack of "energy". Elfman stated, "This is our 10th anniversary as a band and we wanted to present our songs in a way that our fans have grown accustomed to (when) seeing us."

On the choice to eschew an audience, Elfman said at the time, "I hate the poor fidelity and the crowd noise from live albums. It made more sense this way. It's just us playing in a big room with a mobile truck outside—minus the 10,000 screaming teenagers."

== Promotion ==
A remix of the new track "Winning Side" appeared on a promo CD sampler for the album titled Boingo Jr. The track peaked at No. 14 on the Billboard Modern Rock Tracks chart in November 1988.

== Track listing ==
=== Disc 1 ===
All tracks written and composed by Danny Elfman.

Tracks marked with an asterisk do not appear on the LP and cassette versions of the album.

No.	Title	Original release	Length
1.	"Dead Man's Party"	Dead Man's Party (1985)	6:22
2.	"Dead or Alive"	Good for Your Soul (1983)	4:04
3.	"No Spill Blood"	Good for Your Soul	4:32
4.	"Stay"	Dead Man's Party	3:57
5.	"Cinderella Undercover"	Previously unreleased	4:37
6.	"Home Again" (*)	BOI-NGO (1987)	5:24
7.	"Help Me" (*)	Dead Man's Party	3:56
8.	"Just Another Day"	Dead Man's Party	5:07
9.	"It Only Makes Me Laugh"	So-Lo (1984)	3:41
10.	"My Life"	BOI-NGO	4:46
11.	"Nothing to Fear (But Fear Itself)"	Nothing to Fear (1982)	3:48
12.	"Not My Slave"	BOI-NGO	4:08
13.	"We Close Our Eyes" (*)	BOI-NGO	3:29
14.	"Elevator Man" (*)	BOI-NGO	4:26
15.	"Return of the Dead Man" (*)	Instrumental reprise version of "Dead Man's Party"	1:46

=== Disc 2 ===
All tracks written and composed by Danny Elfman, except "Violent Love", by Willie Dixon.

No.	Title	Original release	Length
1.	"Winning Side"	Previously unreleased	3:57
2.	"Wild Sex (in the Working Class)"	Nothing to Fear	4:16
3.	"Grey Matter"	Nothing to Fear	5:42
4.	"Private Life"	Nothing to Fear	3:09
5.	"Gratitude"	So-Lo	4:47
6.	"No One Lives Forever" (*)	Dead Man's Party	4:06
7.	"Mama" (*)	7-inch box set version of BOI-NGO	4:52
8.	"Capitalism" (*)	Only a Lad	4:12
9.	"Who Do You Want to Be"	Good for Your Soul	3:20
10.	"Sweat"	Good for Your Soul	4:29
11.	"Violent Love"	Oingo Boingo EP (1980)	2:21
12.	"On the Outside"	Only a Lad (1981)	3:43
13.	"Only a Lad"	Only a Lad / Oingo Boingo EP	3:50
14.	"Goodbye, Goodbye"	Fast Times at Ridgemont High: Music from the Motion Picture (1982)	3:32
15.	"Country Sweat" (*)	Country rearrangement of "Sweat", from Good for Your Soul	5:13
16.	"Return of the Dead Man 2" (*)	Instrumental reprise version of "Dead Man's Party"	2:40
Total length:			128:12

== Personnel ==
Oingo Boingo

- John Avila – bass, vocals
- Steve Bartek – guitars
- Danny Elfman – vocals, rhythm guitar
- Carl Graves– keyboards, vocals
- Johnny "Vatos" Hernandez – drums, percussion
- Sam Phipps – tenor and soprano saxophones
- Leon Schneiderman – baritone saxophone
- Dale Turner – trumpet, trombone

Additional musician

- Bruce Fowler – trombone

Technical

- Danny Elfman – co-producer
- Steve Bartek – co-producer
- John Avila – co-producer
- Bill Jackson – engineer, mixing
- Jim Scott – additional mixing, additional recording
- Le Mobile – audio recording
- Dean Burt – additional recording
- David Roberts – assistant engineer
- Greg Stevenson – monitors
- Charlie Brocco – assistant engineer (mixing)
- Robert Hart – assistant engineer (mixing)
- Jeff DeMorris – assistant engineer (mixing)
- Stephen Marcussen – mastering
- Vartan – art direction
- DZN, The Design Group – design
- Georganne Deen – illustration
- John Scarpati – group photo
- Steve Jennings – live photos
- John Burlan – live photos
- Laura Engel – live photos
- Sean Riley – live photos
