= Farewell (Oingo Boingo album) =

Live album by Oingo Boingo
- Released: 1996
- Recorded: October 31 – November 1, 1995
- Venues: Universal Amphitheatre, Los Angeles
- Genre: Alternative rock: hard rock
- Length: 145:52
- Label: A&M
- Producers: Danny Elfman; Steve Bartek; John Avila

Oingo Boingo chronology
Boingo (1994)	Farewell (1996)	Anthology (1999)

Farewell: Live from the Universal Amphitheatre, Halloween 1995 is a double live album and home video release by American new wave band Oingo Boingo, documenting their final concerts and ending on Halloween night of 1995. The band played a series of five nights, ending on Halloween night by playing more than 44 songs during a 4-hour set that went past midnight. As with all of their live shows, the setlist included songs from across the band's large discography, many of which were given new arrangements.

Several of the tracks on the CD release were culled from recordings from previous nights in the same tour, meaning the performances occasionally differ between formats. "Just Another Day" and "Nothing to Fear (But Fear Itself)" were included as bonus tracks on the double cassette release.

Farewell is also notable for its inclusion of live performances of several previously unreleased songs, namely "Burn Me Up", "Water", "Piggies" and "Clowns of Death".

== Track listing ==
All tracks are written by Danny Elfman, except "I Am the Walrus" by John Lennon and Paul McCartney.

Disc one
No.	Title	Original release	Length
1.	"Insanity"	Boingo (1994)	7:37
2.	"Little Girls"	Only a Lad (1981)	3:55
3.	"Cinderella Undercover"	Boingo Alive (1988)	4:46
4.	"Controller"	Only a Lad	2:50
5.	"Burn Me Up"	Previously unreleased	2:53
6.	"Insects"	Nothing to Fear (1982)	3:09
7.	"No One Lives Forever"	Dead Man's Party (1985)	4:05
8.	"Hey!"	Boingo	7:47
9.	"Reptiles and Samurai"	Nothing to Fear	5:41
10.	"Water"	Previously unreleased	4:04
11.	"I Am the Walrus/Tender Lumplings"	Boingo	4:03
12.	"Piggies"	Previously unreleased	6:47
13.	"We Close Our Eyes"	BOI-NGO (1987)	4:12
14.	"Mary"	Boingo	6:15
15.	"Can't See (Useless)"	Boingo	4:28
Total length:			72:26

- Cassette version includes "Nothing to Fear (But Fear Itself)" as track 12.

Disc two
No.	Title	Original release	Length
1.	"Helpless"	Boingo cassette release (1994)/"Insanity" CD single B-side (1994)	3:48
2.	"I'm So Bad"	Oingo Boingo EP (1980)	3:33
3.	"Change"	Boingo	8:50
4.	"Stay"	Dead Man's Party	3:39
5.	"Who Do You Want to Be"	Good for Your Soul (1983)	2:59
6.	"On the Outside"	Only a Lad	3:36
7.	"Wild Sex (In the Working Class)"	Nothing to Fear	4:36
8.	"Dead Man's Party"	Dead Man's Party	6:12
9.	"Nasty Habits"	Only a Lad	5:30
10.	"Clowns of Death"	Previously unreleased	6:50
11.	"Ain't This the Life"	Oingo Boingo EP	3:14
12.	"Whole Day Off"	Nothing to Fear	4:28
13.	"Grey Matter"	Nothing to Fear	6:19
14.	"No Spill Blood"	Good for Your Soul	5:23
15.	"Only a Lad"	Oingo Boingo EP/Only a Lad	4:24
Total length:			73:26

- Cassette version includes "Just Another Day" as track 5.

== Home video ==
A home video of Farewell was released on VHS, concurrently with the double album, in 1996. The video release featured additional performances that were not included on the CD release: a "Tender Lumplings" video introduction introduces the show; "Nothing to Fear (But Fear Itself)" is played between "I Am the Walrus" and "Piggies"; and "Just Another Day" is played between "Change" and "Stay". Conversely, the performance of "Whole Day Off" from the CD release does not appear on the video release. Additionally, the video release has "Ain't This the Life" positioned between "On the Outside" and "Wild Sex (In the Working Class)", which also differs from the CD version. A half-hour retrospective documentary was also included in the tape set, as well as the promotional music videos for "Little Girls" and "Insanity".

The 1999 compilation album Anthology contained the "Tender Lumplings" intro from the video release, as well as extra concert dialogue on "Insects", "We Close Our Eyes" and "Whole Day Off" that was omitted from the double album.

The concert video was re-released on DVD on September 18, 2001, as a two-disc set. All the bonus features from the VHS release were included on the second disc, although the two music videos were hidden Easter eggs on the DVD. (Note: Actually, the Easter eggs aren't the music videos themselves, which are hidden in the main DVD 2 menu, but the hidden function of navigating to them from the DVD player remote.) Both discs also included animated menus and a hidden discography slideshow. (Note: Discography slideshow is a kind of "Easter egg" that can be accessed by pressing the button → on the remote control.)

Track listing
	VHS	DVD	
No.	Tape 1 (101:55)	Disc 1	No.
1	Documentary & Retrospective Footage (23:00) (Note: Duration is shown on the VHS cover.)	Intro – Tender Lumplings	1
2	"Insanity"		2
3	"Little Girls"		3
4	"Cinderella Undercover"		4
5	"Controller"		5
6	"Burn Me Up"		6
7	"Insects"		7
8	"No One Lives Forever"		8
9	"Hey!"		9
10	"Reptiles and Samurai"		10
11	"Water"		11
12	"I Am the Walrus"		12
13	"Nothing to Fear (But Fear Itself)"		13
14	"Piggies"		14
15	"We Close Our Eyes"		15
16	"Mary"		16
17	"Can't See (Useless)"		17
	Tape 2 (96:12)		
1 (18)	"Helpless"		18
2 (19)	"I'm So Bad"		19
3 (20)	"Change"		20
4 (21)	"Just Another Day"		21
5 (22)	"Stay"		22
6 (23)	"Who Do You Want to Be"		23
7 (24)	"On the Outside"		24
8 (25)	"Ain't This the Life"		25
9 (26)	"Wild Sex (In the Working Class)"		26
10 (27)	"Dead Man's Party"		27
11 (28)	"Nasty Habits"		28
12 (29)	"Clowns of Death"		29
13 (30)	"Grey Matter"		30
14 (31)	"No Spill Blood"		31
15 (32)	"Only a Lad"		32
		Disc 2	
16 (33)	Documentary & Retrospective Footage (8:00)		1 (33)
17 (34)	Little Girls – The Video (Note: Hidden feature on DVD 2.)		2 (34)
18 (35)	Insanity – The Video		3 (35)

== Personnel ==
Writing, performance and production credits are adapted from the album liner notes.

Oingo Boingo

- Danny Elfman – vocals, guitars
- Steve Bartek – lead guitar
- John Avila – bass guitar, vocals
- Johnny "Vatos" Hernandez – drums, percussion
- Warren Fitzgerald – guitars
- Sam Phipps – tenor and soprano saxophones
- Leon Schneiderman – baritone and alto saxophones
- Dale Turner – trumpet, trombones

Additional musicians

- Marc Mann – keyboards
- Doug Lacy – accordion
- George McMullen – trombone
- Katurah Clarke – additional percussion

Technical

- Danny Elfman – producer
- Steve Bartek – producer
- John Avila – producer
- Bill Jackson – engineer, mixing
- Sylvia Massy – mixing
- John Paterno – additional engineering
- Doug Boehm – assistant engineer
- Charlie Bouis – assistant engineer
- Van Coppock – assistant engineer
- David Nottingham – assistant engineer
- Dave Collins – mastering
- Jeri Heiden – art direction
- N. Kellerhouse – art direction, design
- Dennis Keeley – photography
- Jonathon Rosen – interior Oingo Boingo logo
