= Big Mess (Danny Elfman album) =

2021 studio album by Danny Elfman

Studio album by Danny Elfman
- Released: June 11, 2021
- Recorded: 2020
- Genre: Industrial rock; progressive metal
- Length: 72:18
- Label: Anti-; Epitaph
- Producer: Danny Elfman

Danny Elfman chronology
So-Lo (1984)	Big Mess (2021)	TBA (2025)

Singles from Big Mess
- 1. "Happy" Released: October 2020; 2. "Sorry" Released: January 2021; 3. "Love in the Time of COVID" Released: February 2021; 4. "Kick Me" Released: March 2021; 5. "True" Released: April 2021; 6. "Insects" Released: May 2021

Big Mess is the second solo studio album by American singer, musician, and composer Danny Elfman. It was released by Anti- and Epitaph Records on June 11, 2021.

The album is Elfman's first studio album outside of his film and classical compositions since the 1994 album Boingo with his former band Oingo Boingo, and his first solo pop release since the 1984 album So-Lo. Although Big Mess features former members of Oingo Boingo, such as Steve Bartek, Warren Fitzgerald, and Marc Mann, it is not an Oingo Boingo collaboration in the vein of So-Lo.

== Background and release ==
Elfman had initially written two songs, "Sorry" and "Happy"—his first non-commissioned songs since Oingo Boingo disbanded—that were intended to debut at the Coachella Valley Music and Arts Festival in 2020. The show was also planned to feature a number of reworked versions of Elfman's film score compositions and Oingo Boingo songs, but was cancelled due to the COVID-19 pandemic.

A complete album was then written, unplanned, with Elfman stating that once he started, he "couldn't stop", ultimately writing 18 songs. The songs were demo recorded by Elfman at his home with limited equipment, before being worked up in the studio with the band while contending with COVID-19 restrictions. Many of the demo vocal recordings were kept as the final vocals. Orchestral accompaniments were synthesised and orchestrated by long-time Elfman collaborators Steve Bartek and Marc Mann.

The album was teased with a series of singles, beginning with "Happy" in October 2020, and continuing on from January 2021, with releases on the 11th date of each month.

The album comprises two "heavily contrasting" halves and ends with a new version of the Oingo Boingo song "Insects", from the 1982 album Nothing to Fear.

In December 2021, Anti- and Epitaph Records announced an upcoming deluxe box set which includes four colored vinyl LPs, a 60-page artbook, a life-sized hand of Elfman's as a lamp and a signed poster. Two of the records contain remixes and vocals from musicians such as Trent Reznor, Blixa Bargeld, Rebekah del Rio, Fever333, HEALTH, Squarepusher and Machine Girl. These remixes would, over time, be made more widely available with the release of the remix album Bigger. Messier. and its "Deluxe" edition in 2022. The "Big Mess" box set was nominated for a Grammy 2023 in the category "Best Boxed or Limited Edition Box Set" (Art Director Berit Gwendolyn Gilma).

== Reception ==
Professional ratings
Aggregate scores
Source	Rating
Metacritic	61
Review scores
Source	Rating
American Songwriter	4/5 stars
AllMusic	4/5 stars
Mojo	3/5 stars
PopMatters	5/10

Big Mess was met with primarily positive although somewhat mixed reviews. At Metacritic, which assigns a normalized rating out of 100 to reviews from critics, the album received an average score of 61, based on 7 reviews, indicating "generally favorable reviews".

== Track listing ==
All songs written by Danny Elfman.

=== Disc one ===
No.	Title	Length
1.	"Sorry"	4:53
2.	"True"	4:24
3.	"In Time"	4:27
4.	"Everybody Loves You"	7:04
5.	"Dance with the Lemur"	4:14
6.	"Serious Ground"	5:00
7.	"Choose Your Side"	4:33
8.	"We Belong"	3:50
Total length:		38:25

=== Disc two ===
No.	Title	Length
1.	"Happy"	4:33
2.	"Just a Human"	2:46
3.	"Devil Take Away"	2:49
4.	"Love in the Time of COVID"	3:31
5.	"Native Intelligence"	4:23
6.	"Better Times"	3:14
7.	"Cruel Compensation"	3:11
8.	"Kick Me"	2:11
9.	"Get Over It"	4:06
10.	"Insects"	3:09
Total length:		33:53

== Personnel ==
Musicians

- Danny Elfman – vocals, guitar and synthesizers
- Josh Freese – drums
- Stu Brooks – bass guitar
- Robin Finck – guitar
- Nili Brosh – guitar
- Warren Fitzgerald – guitar
- Sidney Hopson – percussion
- Joe Martone – percussion

Additional musicians

- Petra Haden – female vocal solo
- Holly Sedillos – female chorister
- Anna Schubert – female chorister
- Danielle Withers – female chorister
- Lyris Quartet – strings
- Budapest Art Orchestra – orchestra
- Budapest Scoring Orchestra – orchestra ("Happy" and "Sorry")

Technical

- Danny Elfman – producer
- Steve Bartek – string orchestration
- Marc Mann – orchestration assistant
- Noah Snyder – engineer, mixing
- Zakk Cervini – mixing
- Joel Hamilton – mixing
- Pete Rutcho – mixing
- Randall Dunn – mixing
- Nik Trekov – mixing assistant
- Francisco Botero – mixing assistant
- Ben Greenberg – mixing assistant
- Garrett de Block – mixing assistant
- Nick Rives – additional engineering
- Matt Tuggle – additional engineering
- Joe LaPorta – mastering
- Berit Gwendolyn Gilma – creative/art director

== Bigger. Messier. ==
Bigger. Messier.

Remix album by Danny Elfman
- Released: August 12, 2022
- Genre: Industrial metal; industrial rock
- Label: Anti-; Epitaph

Singles from Bigger. Messier.
- 1. "Kick Me (Zach Hill Remix)" Released: August 12, 2021; 2. "Danny Elfman & Trent Reznor – True" Released: August 11, 2021; 3. "We Belong (Squarepusher Remix)" Released: September 10, 2021; 4. "Serious Ground (Xiu Xiu Remix)" Released: October 12, 2021; 5. "Sorry (Kid606 Remix)" Released: November 30, 2021; 6. "Danny Elfman & Trent Reznor – Native Intelligence" Released: March 21, 2022

Deluxe Edition
- Cover for the Deluxe edition

Both before and after the release of the album, remixes of most of its singles, as well as "We Belong" would be released as promotional standalone singles. Ahead of the release of the album, on April 1, a remix of "Kick Me" by Zach Hill, drummer of experimental rap group Death Grips, was released. After the release, five more remixes were released as singles:

- "True", featuring Trent Reznor of Nine Inch Nails, released on August 11
- "We Belong", remixed by Squarepusher, released on September 10
- "Serious Ground", remixed by Xiu Xiu, released on October 12
- "Sorry", remixed by Kid606, released on November 30
- "Native Intelligence", also featuring Reznor, released on March 21, 2022

On December 8, these remixes, alongside others, were announced to feature in a deluxe box set of the album. A standalone release was not announced at this time.

On June 29, 2022, the remix album Bigger. Messier. was announced for release on August 12. The album would feature most of the remixes contained in the "Deluxe" box set, alongside new ones. In promotion of the announcement, a new remix of "Kick Me" featuring a spoken-word performance by Iggy Pop was released, with an official video created by Carrie Chen and Berit Gwendolyn Gilma. The album was later expanded with a deluxe edition (stylized as Bigger. Messier. (Deluxe.)) released to music streaming services on November 18, 2022. This edition would add the remixes previously exclusive to the "Deluxe" box set of the original album, alongside one new track, a remix of "Sorry" by Ghostemane. The outreaches for the remixes were curated by bassist Stu Brooks and Elfmans's Creative Director Berit Gilma.

=== Track listing ===
All tracks are written by Danny Elfman.

No.	Title	Length
1.	"We Belong (Squarepusher Remix)"	7:13
2.	"Happy (Little Snake Dying in the Club Edition)"	2:47
3.	"Happy (33EMYBW Remix)"	3:00
4.	"Sorry (Kid606 Remix)"	6:09
5.	"We Belong (Rafiq Bhatia Remix)"	3:38
6.	"Kick Me (Zach Hill Remix)"	3:03
7.	"Insects (Machine Girl Insecticidal Tendencies Remix)"	4:30
8.	"Serious Ground (Xiu Xiu Remix)"	5:15
9.	"Cruel Compensation (The Locust Remix)"	2:22
10.	"Everybody Loves You (Boris Remix)"	5:39
11.	"Danny Elfman & Trent Reznor – True"	5:18
12.	"In Time (feat. Blixa Bargeld)"	4:41
13.	"In Time (Kaitlyn Aurelia Smith Remix)"	3:10
14.	"Danny Elfman & Trent Reznor – Native Intelligence"	4:29
15.	"Danny Elfman & Iggy Pop – Kick Me"	3:37
16.	"Kick Me (feat. Fever333)"	2:05
17.	"In Time (HEALTH Remix)"	5:58
18.	"Native Intelligence (Ghostemane Natural Selection Mix)"	3:33
19.	"Happy (Boy Harsher Remix)"	4:48
20.	"Danny Elfman & Trent Reznor – True (Stu Brooks Remix)"	5:59
21.	"Happy (Little Snake Lunar Climax Edition)"	4:26

Digital Bonus Tracks
No.	Title	Length
22.	"Serious Dub (Scientist Remix)"	5:00
23.	"Happy (A.Fruit Remix)"	3:18

Deluxe Edition bonus tracks
No.	Title	Length
24.	"Sorry (Ghostemane Remix)"	4:55
25.	"Kick Me (Zach Hill Remix V2)"	2:20
26.	"Insects (Debugged & Refucked Machine Girl Remix)"	5:54
27.	"Insects (Stu Brooks Remix)"	3:54
28.	"In Time (It All Falls Down) Clipping. Remix"	2:45
29.	"We Belong (feat. Rebekah Del Rio)"	3:45
