= Happy (Danny Elfman song) =

Single by Danny Elfman

from the album Big Mess
- Released: October 29, 2020
- Genre: Industrial
- Length: 4:35
- Label: Anti-; Epitaph
- Songwriter: Danny Elfman
- Producers: Danny Elfman; Randall Dunn

Danny Elfman singles chronology
| "Gratitude" (1984) | "Happy" (2020) | "Sorry" (2021) |

"Happy" is a song written and performed by American singer, musician, and composer Danny Elfman. It was released by Anti- on October 29, 2020. The single is Elfman's first solo pop release since the 1984 album So-Lo.

In a statement, Elfman said, "I originally wrote 'Happy' to perform at Coachella 2020. It was written to be an absurd anti-pop song, designed to begin as a very simple pop tune that degrades into something more subversive. The cynical nature of the lyrics echo how I feel about living in a semi-dystopian world turned upside down."

This should not be confused with Elfman's 1987 song of the same name, which was included on the soundtrack to the film Summer School.

== Credits ==
Adapted from Bandcamp:

- Danny Elfman: Vocals, guitars, synths
- Josh Freese: Drums
- Nili Brosh: Guitars
- Stu Brooks: Bass
- Randall Dunn: Additional synth design
- Steve Bartek: Orchestration
- Budapest Scoring Orchestra: Orchestra
