= Skeletons in the Closet (Oingo Boingo album) =

The Best of Oingo Boingo: Skeletons in the Closet
- Original album artwork by Mark Ryden

Greatest hits album by Oingo Boingo
- Released: January 10, 1989
- Recorded: 1981–83
- Genre: New wave; ska
- Length: 47:41
- Label: A&M
- Producer: Pete Solley, Joe Chiccarelli, Robert Margouleff, Oingo Boingo

Oingo Boingo chronology
Boingo Alive (1988)	The Best of Oingo Boingo: Skeletons in the Closet (1989)	Dark at the End of the Tunnel (1990)

The Best of Oingo Boingo: Skeletons in the Closet is a compilation of songs by American new wave band Oingo Boingo, released in 1989 by A&M Records. It features songs recorded during the band's tenure with I.R.S. Records/A&M Records, culled from the albums Only a Lad (1981), Nothing to Fear (1982) and Good for Your Soul (1983).

== Background ==
Skeletons in the Closet was issued just a few months after the band had released Boingo Alive, a double album of "live in the studio" re-recordings of many songs from their back catalog. In a 1988 article for the Los Angeles Times, Oingo Boingo frontman Danny Elfman stated that Skeletons in the Closet was issued by their former label A&M to directly compete with Boingo Alive, adding, "they’re looking for a way to scrape up a few bucks on a dead account." However, A&M executive Tom Corson denied this claim, stating, "the band feels our release may harm sales of their album. We don’t see it that way at all. In fact, we're fans of the group—and we have no intention of trying to harm their career." Corson added that several songs were removed upon request of the band, and that Elfman declined an offer to write the album's liner notes.

== Track listing ==
All tracks are written by Danny Elfman.

No.	Title	Original release	Length
1.	"Little Girls"	Only a Lad (1981)	3:45
2.	"Private Life" (Edited Version)	Nothing to Fear (1982)	3:19
3.	"On the Outside"	Only a Lad	3:53
4.	"Nasty Habits"	Only a Lad	4:08
5.	"Grey Matter"	Nothing to Fear	5:51
6.	"Only a Lad"	Only a Lad	4:00
7.	"Wake Up (It's 1984)"	Good for Your Soul (1983)	4:44
8.	"Insects"	Nothing to Fear	3:04
9.	"Whole Day Off"	Nothing to Fear	3:58
10.	"Nothing to Fear (But Fear Itself)"	Nothing to Fear	3:55
11.	"Nothing Bad Ever Happens"	Good for Your Soul	3:45
12.	"Who Do You Want to Be"	Good for Your Soul	3:33
Total length:			47:41

== Personnel ==
Credits adapted from CD liner notes.

Oingo Boingo

- Steve Bartek – lead guitar, "rhythm vocals"
- Danny Elfman – lead vocals, rhythm guitar
- Richard Gibbs – keyboards, synthesizer
- Kerry Hatch – bass guitar
- Johnny "Vatos" Hernandez – drums
- Sam "Sluggo" Phipps – tenor sax, soprano sax
- Leon Schneiderman – baritone sax, alto sax
- Dale Turner – trumpet, trombone

Technical

- Pete Solley – producer (1, 3, 4, 6)
- Oingo Boingo – producers (1–6, 8–10)
- Joe Chiccarelli – producer (2, 5, 8–10)
- Robert Margouleff – producer (7, 11, 12)
- John Guarnieri – project coordinator
- Arnie Acosta – mastering
- Chuck Beeson – art direction
- Donald Krieger – design
- Mark Ryden – front and back cover illustration

== Home video ==
A music video compilation was also released by A&M alongside the album.

Song	Album	Year	Director(s)
"Stay"	Dead Man's Party	1985	David Hogan
"Just Another Day"	Dead Man's Party	1985	Stephen R. Johnson
"Gratitude"	So-Lo	1984	Graeme Whifler
"Little Girls"	Only a Lad	1981	Richard Elfman
"Nothing Bad Ever Happens"	Good for Your Soul	1983	Richard Elfman
"Private Life"	Nothing to Fear	1982	Richard Elfman
