= Boi-ngo =

Studio album by Oingo Boingo
- Released: March 2, 1987
- Recorded: August–December 1986
- Studio: Sound Factory (Hollywood); Sunset Sound (Hollywood)
- Genre: New wave; pop rock
- Length: 41:00
- Label: MCA
- Producer: Danny Elfman, Steve Bartek

Oingo Boingo chronology
Dead Man's Party (1985)	Boi-ngo (1987)	Boingo Alive (1988)

Singles from Boi-ngo
- 1. "Pain" Released: October 1986; 2. "We Close Our Eyes / Where Do All My Friends Go" Released: February 1987; 3. "Not My Slave" Released: 1987

Boi-ngo (stylized as BOI-NGO) is the sixth studio album by American new wave band Oingo Boingo, released in 1987 by MCA Records. The tracks "Pain", "We Close Our Eyes" and "Not My Slave" were released as singles.

== Production ==
Boi-ngo was the third Oingo Boingo album to be self-produced by Danny Elfman and Steve Bartek (including So-Lo).

"Not My Slave" and "New Generation" were recorded in the 1985 sessions for Dead Man's Party. Similarly, the sessions for Boi-ngo yielded a number of songs that did not appear on the album, including "Mama", "Inside", "Remember My Name", "Cinderella Undercover", "Tears Will Flow" and "Find You". The song "Happy" was also recorded during the album sessions for release on the Summer School (1987) soundtrack, under Elfman's name.

In addition to the three singles, "Mama" saw a limited release on a 7-inch vinyl box set edition of Boi-ngo. New recordings of both "Cinderella Undercover" and "Mama" appeared on the "live in the studio" album Boingo Alive in 1988.

A 12-inch single release of "Elevator Man", featuring several remixes of the song, was produced but cancelled.

== Reissue ==
In 2022, Rubellan Remasters issued a remastered version of Boi-ngo on both colored vinyl and CD, the latter as an expanded edition with six bonus tracks.

== Track listing ==
All tracks are written by Danny Elfman.

Side one
No.	Title	Length
1.	"Home Again"	5:12
2.	"Where Do All My Friends Go"	4:28
3.	"Elevator Man"	4:30
4.	"New Generation"	5:14

Side two
No.	Title	Length
1.	"We Close Our Eyes"	3:37
2.	"Not My Slave"	4:41
3.	"My Life"	4:34
4.	"Outrageous"	3:44
5.	"Pain"	4:26
Total length:		41:00

7-inch box set bonus track
No.	Title	Length
10.	"Mama"	4:22
Total length:		45:22

2022 CD bonus tracks
No.	Title	Length
10.	"Mama"	4:24
11.	"Pain (Extended Dance Mix)"	7:05
12.	"Not My Slave (Extended Remix)"	5:52
13.	"Weird Science (Boingo Dance Version)"	5:39
14.	"Pain (A Cappella Version)"	4:31
15.	"Not My Slave (Club Dub Mix)"	7:42
Total length:		76:13

== Personnel ==
Oingo Boingo

- John Avila – bass guitar, vocals
- Steve Bartek – guitars
- Mike Bacich – keyboards
- Danny Elfman – vocals, rhythm guitar
- Johnny (Vatos) Hernandez – drums, percussion
- Sam Phipps – tenor saxophone
- Leon Schneiderman – baritone saxophone
- Dale Turner – trumpet

Additional musicians

- Bruce Fowler – trombone
- Carmen Twillie – background vocals ("Pain")
- Maxine Waters – background vocals ("Pain")
- Michael Vlatkovich – trombone

Technical

- Danny Elfman – co-producer
- Steve Bartek – co-producer
- Bill Jackson – engineer; mixing ("Where Do All My Friends Go", "Elevator Man", "Not My Slave", "Outrageous")
- Michael Frondelli – mixing ("Home Again", "New Generation", "Pain")
- Humberto Gatica – mixing ("We Close Our Eyes", "My Life")
- John Avila – deputy vocal producer
- Laura Engel – studio production assistant
- David Knight – second recording engineer
- Jimmy Preziosi H.R.E. – second recording engineer, second mixing engineer (Sunset Sound)
- Judy Clapp – second mixing engineer (Capitol)
- Karen Siegal – second mixing engineer (Lion Share)
- Wally Traugott – mastering
- Vartan – art direction
- Mike Fink – design
- Aaron Rapoport – photography

== Charts ==
Chart (1986/87)	Position
United States (Billboard 200)	77
Australia (Kent Music Report)	98
