= Boingo (album) =

Studio album by Oingo Boingo
- Released: May 17, 1994
- Recorded: February 1993 – January 1994
- Studio: Sunset Sound Factory (Hollywood); The Enterprise (Burbank); A&M (Hollywood); Ocean Way (Hollywood)
- Genre: Alternative rock; progressive rock
- Length: 73:03
- Label: Giant
- Producer: Danny Elfman, Steve Bartek, John Avila

Oingo Boingo chronology
Best O' Boingo (1991)	Boingo (1994)	Farewell (1996)

Singles from Boingo
- 1. "Hey!" Released: April 1994; 2. "Insanity" Released: 1994

Boingo is the eighth and final studio album by American new wave band Oingo Boingo, released in 1994 by Giant Records. With Boingo, the band's sound changed to a guitar-driven rock style, with Danny Elfman having released the keyboard and horn players after the first recording attempt. Many of the songs were either improvised or developed in the studio, and the sessions yielded another album's worth of unreleased material. The single "Hey!" peaked at No. 23 on the Billboard Alternative Songs chart. The band announced in August 1995 that they would be breaking up.

== Background ==
After 1990's Dark at the End of the Tunnel, frontman Danny Elfman felt he was again "starting to get bored" with the band's musical direction and that a change was necessary to stay active. In 1994, he decided to reshuffle the band's line-up without a horn section or keyboards and add second guitarist Warren Fitzgerald. However, horn players Sam Phipps, Leon Schneiderman and Dale Turner, as well as keyboardist Marc Mann, are credited in the album's liner notes. Elfman explained that the band's name was shortened to Boingo at this time in "an arbitrary last-second decision", as both the band and fans had already been referring to them by that name for years.

Boingo was a dramatic departure from the band's previous album releases, featuring an emphasis on guitar-heavy alternative rock and progressive rock with elements of funk, as well as longer song structures and orchestral flourishes. Orchestral arrangements were devised and conducted by lead guitarist and arranger Steve Bartek. Elfman tried to integrate orchestras in a simple manner that would only serve to augment the guitar, bass and drums. He stated that the album's "eclectic" approach was inspired by rediscovering the music of the Beatles through his daughter.

Boingo was the band's first album released by Giant Records after their departure from MCA Records. Elfman observed that the band "didn't feel like we were going anywhere at MCA", and when the long-time head of MCA, Irving Azoff, left for Giant, he asked the band if they would follow.

== Composition and recording ==
Recording for Boingo commenced in February 1993 prior to the change of line-up, but was postponed when Elfman was commissioned to score Tim Burton's The Nightmare Before Christmas (1993). Elfman said that much of the earlier recordings were abandoned, although the since-departed members were credited on the final release.

Elfman wrote "Insanity" during the 1992 U.S. election cycle as a reaction to Dan Quayle and the religious right, and Bartek encouraged him to write more songs in a similar vein. The track was based upon one of Bernard Herrmann's score cues for the film Vertigo (1958). "War Again" was written as a response to American patriotism during the Gulf War. As recording sessions commenced, Elfman started to develop a number of new songs, several of which ended up on the album.

Half of the songs on Boingo were improvised in the studio, which was a new experience for Elfman that he deemed "really fun". "Pedestrian Wolves", "Mary," "Can't See", "Hey!" and the bulk of the 16-minute "Change" were all conceived in the studio. "Pedestrian Wolves" developed from a studio jam that was recorded, which Elfman took home, devised lyrics for and then assembled into a finished song. The cover of the Beatles' "I Am the Walrus" was a jam recorded in one take, simply "to use up the rest of the [tape] reel", and was included on the album after band members lobbied for it.

"Change", the last song recorded for the album, was originally less than four minutes long, but Elfman transformed it into "an experiment of elasticity" via "studio manipulation", adding that the song would have been 30 minutes long if the band had not run out of time and funds. He cited the Beatles' "Revolution 9" as a probable influence on the piece.

The Boingo sessions yielded enough material for two albums. A number of songs went unreleased, including "Water" and "Vultures". Upon the album's release, Elfman opined that Boingo was "the most challenging, fun, and difficult record we've ever done. It felt like a cold bucket of water splashed in our faces", and that he expected long-term fans might be put off by the new sound.

== Release ==
Giant wanted to heavily promote the album as a relaunch of the band. The songs "Hey!" and "Insanity" were released as singles, with an accompanying stop-motion music video for the latter. Giant also hoped to produce a music video for the single "Hey!", but it never came to fruition.

A limited edition package of the album, designed by Deborah Norcross, was issued in a foldout digipak, packaged with an embossed hardcover booklet containing lyrics and additional photography by Anthony Artiaga and Melodie McDaniel.

After the album's release, the band appeared as the musical guest on The Tonight Show with Jay Leno on June 24, 1994. In August 1995, the band announced they would be permanently breaking up later in the year.

Boingo was not issued on vinyl until 2023, when Music on Vinyl released a limited 180 gram colored LP edition via Record Store Day on February 24, followed by a black LP edition on May 5.

== Reception ==
Mark Jenkins of The Washington Post observed that the band had "found a more comfortable niche: bombastic early-'70s-style prog-rock", and while he praised several of the songs' "appealing melodic moments", he ultimately concluded that the band was "too busy showing off to let them be." Steve Hochman of Los Angeles Times felt the album was the group's best since the early '80s, praising Elfman's "more down-to-earth presence" and the band's new "pared-down, guitar-rock attack."

In retrospective reviews, Peter Fawthrop of AllMusic bemoaned the absence of "the plucky instrumentals on past efforts", concluding that the band had "made an unquestionable, 100 percent crossover into grim alternative." Fawthrop also praised the cassette-only "Helpless" as the stand-out track, noting Elfman's "Jack Skellington–mode" vocals, and felt the song "nearly parodies the grieving found on the rest of the album."

"Hey!" peaked at No. 23 on the Billboard Alternative Songs chart in July 1994.

== Track listing ==
All tracks are written by Danny Elfman, except for "I Am the Walrus" by John Lennon and Paul McCartney.

No.	Title	Length
1.	"Insanity"	7:58
2.	"Hey!"	7:43
3.	"Mary"	6:28
4.	"Can't See (Useless)"	4:35
5.	"Pedestrian Wolves"	9:21
6.	"Lost Like This"	4:54
7.	"Spider"	5:27
8.	"War Again"	5:53
9.	"I Am the Walrus"	4:09
10.	"Tender Lumplings"	0:37
11.	"Change"	15:58
Total length:		73:03

Bonus track
No.	Title	Length
12.	"Helpless" (Exclusive to US/IDN cassette and EU/AUS CD releases)	3:36
Total length:		76:39

== Personnel ==
Oingo Boingo

- Danny Elfman – vocals, guitars
- Steve Bartek – lead guitar
- John Avila – bass, vocals
- Johnny "Vatos" Hernandez – drums, percussion
- Warren Fitzgerald – guitars
- Sam Phipps – tenor and soprano saxophones
- Leon Schneiderman – baritone sax
- Dale Turner – trumpet, trombones
- Marc Mann – keyboards, samples
- Doug Lacy – accordion

Additional personnel

- Rich Sumner – additional percussion
- Katurah Clarke – additional percussion
- Carl Graves – backing vocals ("Lost Like This")
- Cameron Graves – backing vocals ("Insanity")
- Taylor Graves – backing vocals ("Insanity")
- Maxine Waters – backing vocals ("Pedestrian Wolves")
- Julia Waters – backing vocals ("Pedestrian Wolves")
- Fred Seykora – solo cello ("Mary")

Technical

- Danny Elfman – co-producer, orchestral arrangements
- Steve Bartek – co-producer, orchestral conductor, orchestrator
- John Avila – co-producer
- Shawn Murphey – orchestral engineer
- Bruce Dukov – orchestral concertmaster
- Patti Zimitti – orchestral contractor
- Bill Jackson – engineer
- Mike Piersante – second engineer
- Marty Horenburg – second engineer
- Steve Thompson – co-mixer
- Michael Barbiero – co-mixer, additional recording
- Mike Baumgartner – second engineer (mixing)
- Chad Munsey – second engineer (mixing)
- Jimmy "King" Amson – studio tech
- Tim Durfey – studio tech
- Nick Jeen – studio tech
- Bruce Jacoby – studio tech
- Matt Luneau – studio tech (Drum Doctors)
- George Marino – mastering
- Deborah Norcross – art direction, design
- Anthony Artiaga – photography
- Melodie McDaniel – band photos
- Mike Diehl – ideoque typeface design
