= Dead Man's Party (song) =

1986 single by Oingo Boingo

Single by Oingo Boingo

from the album Dead Man's Party
- B-side: "Stay"
- Released: 1986
- Recorded: August 1985
- Genre: Rock
- Length: 6:23 (album version) 4:14 (b-side edit); 3:52 (video edit) 8:37 (Party 'Til You're Dead Mix)
- Label: MCA
- Songwriter: Danny Elfman
- Producers: Danny Elfman, Steve Bartek

Oingo Boingo singles chronology
"Just Another Day" (1986)	"Dead Man's Party" (1986)	"Stay" (1986)

"Dead Man's Party" is a song by American band Oingo Boingo, released as the third single from their 1985 album of the same name.

The song was released on a 12" single in conjunction with another song from the album, "Stay," with the cover art touting it as the single's a-side, while the catalog number and some discographies consider it the single's b-side. An edited version of "Dead Man's Party" was featured in a promotional music video and was issued in 1986 as the b-side of the 7" single "Just Another Day", also culled from the Dead Man's Party album.

The lyric, "I hear the chauffeur coming to my door/Says there's room for maybe just one more," is a reference to "The Bus-Conductor," a short story by E. F. Benson about a hearse driver, first published in The Pall Mall Magazine in 1906. The story has been adapted several times and spawned an urban legend, with each version using the catchphrase, "Room for one more."

The song appeared in the movie Back to School with Oingo Boingo themselves performing the song in a cameo.

Danny Elfman performed the song as the final encore of his Nightmare Before Christmas concerts at the Hollywood Bowl in 2015, 2016, and 2018, and at Banc of California Stadium in 2021, alongside his former Oingo Boingo guitarist and arranger Steve Bartek.

== Track listing ==
12" single

1. Dead Man's Party (Party 'Til You're Dead Mix) - 8:37
2. Stay (Stay Late Mix) - 5:59

== Personnel ==
- Danny Elfman – lead vocals, rhythm guitar
- Steve Bartek – lead guitar
- John Avila – bass, keytar, vocals
- Mike Bacich – keyboards
- Johnny "Vatos" Hernandez – drums, percussion
- Sam Phipps – tenor saxophone
- Leon Schneiderman – baritone & alto saxophones
- Dale Turner – trumpet, trombone
- Michael Frondelli - mixing
