= Good for Your Soul =

Studio album by Oingo Boingo
- Released: July 26, 1983
- Recorded: January – June 29, 1983
- Studio: Baby O Recorders (Hollywood); Crystal Industries (Hollywood)
- Genre: New wave; ska; hard rock
- Length: 41:42
- Label: A&M
- Producer: Robert Margouleff

Oingo Boingo chronology
| Nothing to Fear (1982) | Good for Your Soul (1983) | So-Lo (1984) |

Singles from Good for Your Soul
- 1. "Wake Up (It's 1984) / Sweat" Released: July 1983; 2. "Nothing Bad Ever Happens / Who Do You Want to Be" Released: 1983 (US); 3. "Good for Your Soul" Released: 1983 (Bolivia)

Good for Your Soul is the third studio album by American new wave band Oingo Boingo, released in 1983 by A&M Records. It was produced by Robert Margouleff and was the band's last album to be released on A&M Records.

== Composition and production ==
The track "No Spill Blood" is inspired by the H. G. Wells novel The Island of Dr. Moreau, specifically Erle C. Kenton's 1932 film adaptation of this novel, titled Island of Lost Souls.

Of "Nothing Bad Ever Happens", Danny Elfman said, "It's about somebody who chooses to ignore his neighbors' problems and doesn't get involved - but it's really about getting involved... We can't live like ostriches."

"Wake Up (It's 1984)" is based on the George Orwell novel Nineteen Eighty-Four. The instrumental track "Cry of the Vatos", named after drummer Johnny "Vatos" Hernandez, contains a back-masked message jokingly promoting Christianity to its listeners.

Two outtakes from these sessions, "Lightning" and "Cool City", were released on Elfman's So-Lo album in 1984. Other outtakes include "All the Pieces" and "Waiting for You".

== Promotion ==
The music video accompanying "Nothing Bad Ever Happens" depicts the band performing on a paradise island; Elfman appears watching TV, unaware that his house is being robbed behind him, referencing the lyrics of the first verse. He finishes taking a bath, before the tub catches fire, and catches sight of guitarist Steve Bartek being carried down the street by a lynch mob, but decides to ignore. The video ends with Elfman serving the singing severed heads of the band's horn section to three upper class diners, who at first appear shocked, but proceed to eat regardless. The paradise island from the start of the video then appears to get hit by a nuclear bomb while the band continue playing.

The band appeared in Nam June Paik's Good Morning, Mr. Orwell on New Years Day of 1984, performing "Wake Up (It's 1984)".

== Critical reception ==
Ira A. Robbins of Trouser Press praised Good for Your Soul, particularly producer Robert Margouleff for giving the band a "streamlined and powerfully driven attack", calling "Wake Up (It's 1984)" and "Who Do You Want to Be" "among the most invigorating and engaging things the band has ever done." In a retrospective review, Steven McDonald of AllMusic called the album "underrated" but bemoaned its "inconsistency".

== Reissue ==
In 2021, Rubellan Remasters issued a remastered version of Good for Your Soul on both colored vinyl and CD, the latter as an expanded edition with three bonus tracks.

== Track listing ==
All tracks are written by Danny Elfman.

Side one
| No. | Title | Length |
|---|---|---|
| 1. | "Who Do You Want to Be" | 3:31 |
| 2. | "Good for Your Soul" | 3:16 |
| 3. | "No Spill Blood" | 3:42 |
| 4. | "Cry of the Vatos" | 2:21 |
| 5. | "Fill the Void" | 3:42 |
| 6. | "Sweat" | 4:31 |

Side two
| No. | Title | Length |
|---|---|---|
| 1. | "Nothing Bad Ever Happens" | 3:45 |
| 2. | "Wake Up (It's 1984)" | 4:44 |
| 3. | "Dead or Alive" | 4:04 |
| 4. | "Pictures of You" | 4:03 |
| 5. | "Little Guns" | 3:42 |
| Total length: | | 41:42 |

=== 2021 CD bonus tracks ===
| No. | Title | Length |
|---|---|---|
| 12. | "Bachelor Party" | 3:49 |
| 13. | "Something Isn't Right" | 3:42 |
| 14. | "Wake Up (It's 1984) (Single Version)" | 3:00 |
| Total length: | | 52:13 |

== Personnel ==
Oingo Boingo

- Danny Elfman – lead vocals, rhythm guitar
- Steve Bartek – lead guitar
- Ribbs – keyboards
- Kerry Hatch – bass guitar, bass synthesizer
- Johnny "Vatos" Hernandez – drums
- Sam "Sluggo" Phipps – lead tenor saxophone, clarinet, horn solos
- Leon Schneiderman – baritone saxophone, alto saxophone, original instruments
- Dale Turner – trumpet, trombone, horn solos

Additional musicians

- Miles Anderson – additional horns ("Cry of the Vatos", "Dead or Alive", "Wake Up (It's 1984)")
- Mario Guarneri – additional horns ("Cry of the Vatos", "Dead or Alive", "Wake Up (It's 1984)")
- Jimmy Wood – harmonica ("Sweat")
- Marko Babineau – backup vocals ("Dead or Alive", "No Spill Blood")
- Mike Gormley – backup vocals ("Dead or Alive", "No Spill Blood")

Technical

- Robert Margouleff – producer
- Howard Siegel – engineer
- Steve MacMillian – assistant engineer extraordinaire
- Stephen Marcussen – mastering
- Steve Bartek – horn arrangements
- Darron Cray – studio assistance
- Laura Engel – production manager
- Lynn Robb – art direction
- Lane Smith – front cover illustration
- Georganne Deen – back cover illustration
- Francis Delia – inner sleeve photography
