= So-Lo =

Studio album by Danny Elfman
- Released: November 1984
- Recorded: April 1983; July 1984
- Studio: Ground Control (Santa Monica)
- Genres: New wave; synth-pop; ska
- Length: 38:34
- Label: MCA
- Producers: Danny Elfman, Steve Bartek, Paul Ratajczak

Danny Elfman chronology
So-Lo (1984)	Big Mess (2021)

Oingo Boingo chronology
Good for Your Soul (1983)	So-Lo (1984)	Dead Man's Party (1985)

Singles from So-Lo
- 1. "Gratitude / Tough As Nails" Released: 1984

So-Lo is the debut studio album by American musician Danny Elfman, released in 1984 by MCA Records. Recorded primarily by Elfman, but also featuring the members of his band, Oingo Boingo, it was recorded when Elfman was offered a solo contract with MCA after the band had been dropped from I.R.S. Records. The album marked the band's last release to feature bassist Kerry Hatch and keyboardist Richard Gibbs.

== Background ==
So-Lo was produced during a hiatus for Oingo Boingo, following the departure of Hatch and Gibbs. Elfman described the album as "a chance to experiment with slower tempos" and added that "it was fun to do some ballads and try to snap out of that image that a lot of people have of me just writing real fast (...) tunes."

While much of the instrumentation features synth programming from Elfman, Oingo Boingo's remaining members all performed on the album, with Flea of the then-recently formed Red Hot Chili Peppers providing "additional bass guitar". Unlike the material for previous Oingo Boingo albums, which had been fully rehearsed and arranged by the band prior to recording, some tracks on So-Lo, such as "Gratitude", were loose ideas that the band brought into the studio and developed into finished songs via improvisation. The tracks "Cool City" and "Lightning" originated from the 1983 sessions for Good for Your Soul.

Despite rumors at the time of the band breaking up, Elfman later stated that So-Lo was "not made out of frustration" and that he was more committed to the group than ever before. However, a 1987 article published in BAM magazine, in which Elfman was interviewed about the band's past, suggested that Oingo Boingo had in fact considered disbanding in 1984. This was underscored by a 1990 interview for Music Connection, where Elfman stated that this period marked the closest the band had ever come to breaking up: "Not only were we between labels, but we didn't know where we were going and weren't earning a living at the time and we had guys in the band who weren't a hundred percent into it."

In 2020, Oingo Boingo guitarist Steve Bartek stated that So-Lo was "mostly a band record", but that MCA "wasn't particularly interested" in Oingo Boingo and so had signed Elfman as a solo artist. However, Elfman wanted to continue the band and convinced MCA to change his recording contract to Oingo Boingo following the release of So-Lo.

== "Gratitude" versions ==
Original vinyl and cassette releases contained an alternate, earlier mix of the opening song, "Gratitude". Among other differences, this 5:04 mix included a spoken verse cut from all other versions; this was also the version used on the soundtrack to the film Beverly Hills Cop (1984). The original CD release contained the full 5:12 album mix.

The missing verse is as follows:

I used to eat people like you for breakfast
I used to fly, high up in the sky
I used to chew up rocks and spit out gravel
I had a heart as cold as ice

This verse was retained for live performances of the song, sometimes with slightly different lyrics, and was also featured on the re-recording of the song for Boingo Alive in 1988.

The 12-inch single release for "Gratitude" used a shorter 4:42 mix, parenthetically named the "Short Version", and the accompanying music video featured an even shorter 4:08 edit. Confusingly, CD releases erroneously titled the 5:12 album mix as the "Short Version", while later vinyl reissues replaced the album mix with the 12-inch "Short Version".

== Reissues ==
In 2014, So-Lo was reissued on CD by Varèse Sarabande, with one bonus track. In 2022, a remaster was issued by Rubellan Remasters as an expanded edition CD with five bonus tracks, as well as a colored vinyl LP.

== Track listing ==
All tracks are written by Danny Elfman.

Side one
No.	Title	Length
1.	"Gratitude" (5:04 early vinyl & cassette; 4:42 "Short Version" on later issues)	5:12
2.	"Cool City"	3:26
3.	"Go Away"	4:00
4.	"Sucker for Mystery"	5:15

Side two
No.	Title	Length
1.	"It Only Makes Me Laugh"	4:03
2.	"The Last Time"	4:07
3.	"Tough as Nails"	4:35
4.	"Lightning"	3:44
5.	"Everybody Needs"	3:50
Total length:		38:34

2014 CD bonus track
No.	Title	Length
10.	"Gratitude (Single Edit)" (Video Edit)	4:08
Total length:		42:42

2022 CD bonus tracks
No.	Title	Length
10.	"Gratitude (Original Version)"	5:05
11.	"Gratitude (Extended Dance Version)"	6:44
12.	"Gratitude (Single Version)"	4:04
13.	"Gratitude (Tornado Version)"	7:02
14.	"Gratitude (Short Version)"	4:47
Total length:		66:16

== Personnel ==
"The Cast"

- Danny Elfman – vocals, percussion, programming
- Steve Bartek – guitars, programming
- Rich Gibbs – synthesizers, special DX-7 programming
- Paul Fox – synthesizers
- Kerry Hatch – basses
- John Hernandez – drums, percussion
- Leon Schneiderman – baritone sax
- Sam Phipps – tenor sax
- Dale Turner – trumpet, trombone

Additional musician

- The liner notes on some versions (including the 2014 CD reissue) list "Special Thanx" to "Michael Flea for his extra bass work."

Technical

- Steve Bartek – co-producer, arrangements
- Danny Elfman – co-producer, arrangements
- Paul Ratajczak – co-producer, engineer
- Spozzi the "Spazz" – assistant engineer
- Laura Engel – production assistant
- Greg Fulginiti – mastering
- Georganne Deen – art direction, illustration
- Aaron Rapoport – photography
