= Nothing to Fear (Oingo Boingo album) =

Studio album by Oingo Boingo
- Released: June 22, 1982
- Recorded: November 1981–January 1982
- Studio: Cherokee (Hollywood)
- Genre: New wave
- Length: 41:34
- Labels: I.R.S.; A&M
- Producers: Oingo Boingo; Joe Chiccarelli

Oingo Boingo chronology
Only a Lad (1981)	Nothing to Fear (1982)	Good for Your Soul (1983)

Singles from Nothing to Fear
- 1. "Private Life / Wild Sex (In The Working Class)" Released: June 1982; 2. "Grey Matter / Nothing to Fear" Released: 1982 (Bolivia); 3. "Whole Day Off" Released: 1982 (US)

Nothing to Fear is the second studio album by American new wave band Oingo Boingo, released in 1982 by A&M Records.

== Music ==
Nothing to Fear possesses a more hard-edged sound than the band's previous releases, featuring louder electric guitar and percussion, an increased and more varied use of synthesizers and the introduction of sequencers on some tracks. The songs also feature an unorthodox range of instruments, some of which were designed and built by the band.

The original 3:47 mix of the song "Private Life" was replaced on later vinyl pressings and CD issues by the 3:18 single mix.

In April 2020, Danny Elfman recorded a new solo version of "Running on a Treadmill", uploaded to his official website and Instagram page. It was recorded in self-quarantine during the COVID-19 pandemic and featured an accompanying video filmed by his daughter, Mali Elfman. At the time, it was only one of two Oingo Boingo songs Elfman had publicly performed since the band broke up in 1995. Elfman later recorded a new version of "Insects" for his 2021 album, Big Mess.

== Reception and promotion ==
Trouser Press writer Ira A. Robbins opined that Nothing to Fear was "more likable" than its predecessor, Only a Lad, but still sounded "phony", calling it a "derivative disappointment."

Elfman often used the negativity of critics to the band's advantage through publicity, stating: "The music [the critics] like is inspirationless and contrived. If we start getting praise from this clique of six or eight reviewers, we'd probably have to evaluate where we went astray."

Following the album's release, the band went on a successful tour opening for bands such as the Police and Fear. The single release of "Private Life" was accompanied by a music video, directed by Elfman's brother Richard, founder of the Mystic Knights of the Oingo Boingo.

== Reissue ==
In 2021, Rubellan Remasters issued a remastered version of Nothing to Fear on both colored vinyl and CD, the latter as an expanded edition with two bonus tracks. Both versions reinstated the original full-length version of "Private Life" into the album's running order.

== Track listing ==
All tracks are written by Danny Elfman.

Side one
No.	Title	Length
1.	"Grey Matter"	5:50
2.	"Insects"	3:02
3.	"Private Life" (3:18 on later issues)	3:45
4.	"Wild Sex (in the Working Class)"	4:06
5.	"Running on a Treadmill"	3:20

Side two
No.	Title	Length
1.	"Whole Day Off"	3:54
2.	"Nothing to Fear (But Fear Itself)"	3:52
3.	"Why'd We Come"	3:57
4.	"Islands"	4:40
5.	"Reptiles and Samurai"	5:23
Total length:		41:34

=== 2021 CD bonus tracks ===
No.	Title	Length
11.	"Better Luck Next Time"	3:30
12.	"Private Life" (Single Version)	3:17
Total length:		48:21

== Personnel ==
Oingo Boingo

- Danny Elfman – lead vocals, rhythm guitar
- Steve Bartek – lead guitar, vocals
- Richard Gibbs – keyboards, synthesizers, vocals
- Kerry Hatch – bass, vocals
- Johnny "Vatos" Hernandez – drums
- Sam "Sluggo" Phipps – tenor saxophone, soprano saxophone
- Leon Schneiderman – baritone saxophone, alto saxophone
- Dale Turner – trumpet, trombone
- The inner sleeve notes from Nothing to Fear state: "All the boys bang things: Rumba-phones, original instruments designed and built by Leon Schneiderman."

Technical

- Oingo Boingo – co-producers
- Joe Chiccarelli – co-producer, engineer
- Krohn McHenry – second engineer (recording)
- Laura Engel – production assistant
- Mitch Gibson – second engineer (mixing)
- Steve Bartek – horn arrangements
- Charlie Unkeless – production manager
- Georganne Deen – front cover (from the Lou & Pearl Beach collection)
- Jules Bates – back cover and sleeve, art direction (Artrouble)
