= Forbidden Zone =

1982 film by Richard Elfman

- Theatrical reissue poster
- Directed by: Richard Elfman
- Screenplay by: Richard Elfman; Matthew Bright; Nick James; Nick L. Martinson
- Story by: Richard Elfman
- Produced by: Richard Elfman
- Starring: Hervé Villechaize; Susan Tyrrell; Marie-Pascale Elfman; Danny Elfman; Gisele Lindley; Jan Stuart Schwartz; Virginia Rose; Ugh-Fudge Bwana; Phil Gordon; Hyman Diamond; Toshiro Boloney; Viva; Joe Spinell; The Kipper Kids
- Cinematography: Gregory Sandor
- Edited by: Martin Nicholson
- Music by: Danny Elfman
- Production companies: Hercules Films, Ltd. Carl Borack Productions
- Distributed by: The Samuel Goldwyn Company
- Release dates: March 28, 1980 (Los Angeles); March 21, 1982; (United States)
- Running time: 74 minutes
- Country: United States
- Language: English
- Budget: ~$100,000

Forbidden Zone is an American absurdist musical fantasy comedy film produced and directed by independent filmmaker Richard Elfman, and co-written by Elfman and Matthew Bright. Shot in 1977 and 1978, the film premiered in 1980 and was distributed in 1982. Originally shot on black-and-white film, Forbidden Zone is based upon the stage performances of the Los Angeles theater troupe The Mystic Knights of the Oingo Boingo, of which Elfman, Bright and many of the cast and crew were a part, and revolves around an alternate universe accessed through a door in the house of the Hercules family.

The composing debut of Danny Elfman, it stars Hervé Villechaize, Susan Tyrrell and members of the Mystic Knights, with appearances by Warhol superstar Viva, Joe Spinell and The Kipper Kids. Villechaize kicked his cheque back into production and even painted sets on weekends. The only paid actor was Phil Gordon, who played Flash; all the other SAG actors put their money back into the show.

The film was made as an attempt to capture the essence of The Mystic Knights of the Oingo Boingo's live performances in a cinematic sense, and also as a means for both director Elfman to retire from music to work on film projects, and to serve as a transition between the group's former cabaret style and a new wave-based style. Amid negative reactions to content in the film that had been perceived as being offensive, Forbidden Zone was screened as a midnight movie, where it was met with positive notices, and developed a large and eventually worldwide cult following. In 2004, the film was digitally restored and released on DVD, and in 2008, the film was colorized.

Said Elfman, "Doing anything original is taking a chance. Financially it bankrupted me and we lost our house. But I'm still glad I did it (although I'd change a few things if I had a time machine, of course)."

A prospective sequel, entitled Forbidden Zone 2: The Forbidden Galaxy, has long been in development by Elfman, who launched a successful crowdfunding campaign in 2014 to raise an initial sum. As of 2019, the sequel is still in the stages of development but regularly updated and discussed by Elfman. Elfman has also licensed Forbidden Zone as an intellectual property for manufacturers to produce collectibles based on the film's characters.

== Plot ==
Slumlord Huckleberry P. Jones, stashing heroin in the basement of a vacant house that he owns, stumbles through a mysterious door to the Sixth Dimension. He promptly flees, retrieving the heroin, and sells the house to the Hercules family. On their way to school, teenaged siblings Susan "Frenchy" and Flash Hercules talk with their friend Squeezit Henderson. He recounts seeing a vision of his transgender sister René, who has recently fallen into the Sixth Dimension.

After a chaotic day at school, Frenchy returns home and investigates the basement's forbidden door. Falling into the Sixth Dimension, she is captured by the perpetually topless Princess and brought before the dwarf King Fausto and his queen, Doris. The king falls for Frenchy, and a jealous Doris orders their frog servant, Bust Rod, to lock her up. Fausto tells Bust Rod to take Frenchy to Cell 63, where the king keeps his favorite concubines (as well as René).

The next day at school, Flash asks Squeezit to help him rescue René and Frenchy. Squeezit is too scared, so Flash enlists the help of "Gramps" Hercules, a deranged former wrestler. Once in the Sixth Dimension, they receive advice from an old Jewish man but are soon captured by Bust Rod. Doris interrogates Flash and Gramps before lowering them into a septic tank, then sends all the denizens of Cell 63 to a torture chamber. The Princess begins to torture Frenchy with an electrical device, but it blows a fuse and the torture is put on hold.

Flash and Gramps escape the septic tank and come across a woman who says that she was once happily married to the king, until Doris supplanted her. They release the ex-queen, who has been sitting in her cell for 1,000 years, writing a screenplay to keep her sanity. Meanwhile, Pa Hercules carelessly ignites a vat of tar with a cigarette butt in his workplace at the La Brea Tar Pits. The resulting explosion blasts him through the stratosphere, and he falls back down through the basement and into the Sixth Dimension, where he too is imprisoned.

Finding a phone, Flash calls Squeezit and again asks for his help. Squeezit musters his courage and enters the Sixth Dimension, where he is immediately captured by Satan. They strike a deal: Squeezit will abduct the Princess, for whom Satan lusts, and in return Satan will help to free René and Frenchy. Squeezit brings the Princess, but since he omitted to bargain for his own freedom, Satan has him decapitated.

Fausto forces Bust Rod to release Frenchy and René, whom he orders to leave the Sixth Dimension to avoid the Queen's wrath. However, en route to safety, René is stricken with pseudo-menstrual cramps, and they are again captured by the frog. Squeezit's disembodied head, which has grown wings instead of dying, finds the king and warns him. Fausto forcibly recruits Flash and Gramps, who have gotten distracted and are having sex with random concubines.

Doris prepares to have Frenchy thrown into a cage of feral Ottomans who will rape her to death and throw her body into a pit of spikes, but the ex-queen confronts her, pushing Bust Rod into the spike pit. As the two queens engage in a cat-fight, Doris distracts her rival with a kiss and throws her into the spike pit. Fausto arrives with Flash and Gramps, warning Doris that Satan is holding the Princess hostage and, per his agreement with Squeezit, will kill her if René and Frenchy are not freed. Ma Hercules enters and sees Flash lying on the ground, where Gramps has coincidentally knocked him over, and shoots Doris. Fausto comforts Doris as she dies in his arms, then throws her body into the spike pit. Meanwhile, the desperately horny René has willingly jumped into the cage of Ottomans and is having the time of her life.

After a (brief) period of mourning, Frenchy is crowned as Fausto's new queen, and the surviving characters gleefully plan to conquer the galaxy.

== Cast ==
- Hervé Villechaize as King Fausto of the Sixth Dimension
- Susan Tyrrell as Queen Doris of the Sixth Dimension / Ruth Henderson
- Gisele Lindley as The Princess
- Jan Stuart Schwartz as Bust Rod
- Marie-Pascale Elfman as Susan B. "Frenchy" Hercules
- Virginia Rose as Ma Hercules
- Ugh-Fudge Bwana (Gene Cunningham) as Huckleberry P. Jones / Pa Hercules
- Phil Gordon as Flash Hercules
- Hyman Diamond as Gramps Hercules
- Toshiro Boloney as Squeezit Henderson / René Henderson
- Danny Elfman as Satan
- Viva as The Ex-Queen
- Joe Spinell as Mr. Henderson
- The Kipper Kids as Themselves
- Kedric Wolfe as Miss Feldman / Human Chandelier
- Herman Bernstein as Mr. Bernstein, the Old Yiddish Man
- Richard Elfman as a masseur
- The Mystic Knights of the Oingo Boingo as Themselves

== Musical numbers ==
1. "Forbidden Zone" (Danny Elfman) – Danny Elfman and The Mystic Knights of the Oingo Boingo
2. "Some of These Days" (Shelton Brooks) – Pa Hercules, Frenchy and Ma Hercules (voice of Cab Calloway)
3. "Beautiful Dreamer" (excerpt) (Stephen Foster) – Ma Hercules
4. "La Petite Tonkinoise" (Vincent Scotto, Henri Christiné, Georges Villard) - Frenchy (voice of Josephine Baker)
5. "Bim Bam Boom" (Noro Morales, Johnny Camacho) - The Kipper Kids and Miguelito Valdés
6. "Witch's Egg" (Susan Tyrrell, Georg Michalski) – Doris
7. "Pleure" (Jérôme Savary) – Frenchy (voice of Josephine Baker)
8. "Alphabet Song" (D. Elfman) – Miss Feldman, Flash, Squeezit and Schoolkids
9. "Queen's Revenge" (D. Elfman) – Doris, Frenchy, Princess, René and Prisoners
10. "Pico and Sepulveda" (Eddie Maxwell, Jule Styne) – Pa Hercules and Chorus (voices of Felix Figueroa & His Orchestra)
11. "Squeezit the Moocher" (Cab Calloway, Irving Mills, D. Elfman) – Squeezit, The Princess, Satan and The Mystic Knights of the Oingo Boingo
12. "Yiddishe Charleston" (Billy Rose, Fred Fisher) – the masseur
13. "Finale" (D. Elfman, R. Elfman, Nicholas James) – Frenchy, Fausto, Princess, Doris, Ex-Queen, The Kipper Kids, The Mystic Knights of the Oingo Boingo, Flash, Gramps, René, Squeezit, Huckleberry and Company

== Production ==
=== Development ===
The Mystic Knights of the Oingo Boingo were formed in late 1972 by Richard Elfman, as a musical theatre troupe. As Richard's interest shifted to filmmaking, he passed leadership of the band to younger brother Danny Elfman. Danny, who had begun to lose interest in musical theatre, had gained interest in other musical styles such as ska, and had become "sick of lugging around so much stuff with the theatre troupe. Towards the end", he remembers, "it was a big production... there was, like a semi full of stuff. And that was becoming burdensome. So, for me, the idea of being a band that can fit all their gear into a van and set up in a club, and an hour later be playing, became a goal." Production began during a transitional period when the group was moving from its cabaret style towards a more pop/rock format; by the time the film was completed, the band had shortened its name to Oingo Boingo.

The film was originally conceived as The Hercules Family, a 16mm musical that consisted of twelve musical numbers and a story loosely constructed around them. But as the project grew to 35mm and the storyline evolved, Richard Elfman found himself re-shooting many of the original scenes to fit the new film. Two sequences from the original 16mm footage were featured on the 2004 DVD release: one of Danny Elfman, as Satan, performing "Minnie the Moocher" (later reshot with visual elements borrowed from the original 16mm sequence and alternate lyrics), and another of Marie-Pascale Elfman, singing "Johnny". The sequence with Elfman as Satan, and members of the Oingo Boingo as his minions, came from live shows, in which the band would perform Cab Calloway tunes like "St. James Infirmary Blues" in the same costumes.

Marie-Pascale Elfman, at the time of shooting, was married to director Richard Elfman. She designed the film's expressionistic sets and starred in the film. Actor and former Mystic Knight Gene Cunningham helped fund the film. When Cunningham and Elfman ran out of money during production, Richard and Marie-Pascale Elfman helped finance by selling houses, before Carl Borack put money into the production in order for Elfman to complete the film. According to Elfman, he had originally intended the film to be screened in color, stating that the original plan was to ship the film to China, where each frame would be hand-tinted, but that this plan was not practical within the production costs. Elfman ultimately went bankrupt during the production of Forbidden Zone and had to assign the rights away in order to finish the film; in 2015, Elfman regained the full rights to Forbidden Zone.

=== Casting ===
Actor Hervé Villechaize was a former roommate of co-writer and co-star Matthew Bright; Villechaize had previously dated co-star Susan Tyrrell. The Elfmans' grandfather, Herman Bernstein, also appeared in the film, and Richard Elfman's accountant appeared under the name "Hyman Diamond" because Elfman had no idea whether or not he wanted to be credited. Others who worked on the film include The Kipper Kids (Brian Routh and Martin von Haselberg), Joe Spinell, and former Warhol superstar Viva.

=== Writing ===
Forbidden Zone featured Bright's first work on film, and his only work as an actor (under the name "Toshiro Baloney" in the color version). A founding member of the Mystic Knights, Bright later became a screenwriter and director in his own right. Bright's credits include Freeway, Ted Bundy, and Tiptoes. Bright and director Richard Elfman's only dispute during the screenwriting process was over a scene in which his character, Squeezit, was originally to have been beaten up for eight minutes and have the walls wiped with his blood. Another scene cut from the script would have had Squeezit being castrated. According to Bright, "I didn't have any sense of limits or balance then, at the time, I... you know, I was just, didn't know what I was doing. I needed reining in." During filming, Bright was sitting on the set in costume when a lighting stand fell onto his head, cracking his skull, and he had to be rushed to the hospital. When Bright returned to work the next day, he had a mild concussion and whiplash, but he continued with filming.

=== Directing ===
Richard Elfman had never gone to film school when production started, and "I didn't know what I was getting into." The production, from its original 16mm roots to its finish, took three years. Cast and crew members would sleep on the film's stage, wearing spare gorilla suits to stay warm. Among the film's artistic influences included 1940s big band and jazz music and Max Fleischer cartoons of the 1930s (such as Betty Boop). Some of the film's cast was made up of non-professionals cast off the street. In one scene, Richard Elfman brought in a young man to mouth the words of "Bim Bam Boom", but when he was put in front of the camera, he stood there as the scene was shot. Elfman left the scene in the film by editing in Bright's lips over the actor's face. Another scene featured homeless men.

=== Animation ===
The film's animation was created by then-unknown animator John Muto. Because of the film's low budget, Muto created all of the film's animation sequences himself. Muto made frequent use of airbrush techniques to establish for himself a distinctive style. For sequences in which live-action and animation were combined, the actors were photographed in tight head-on and profile shots, and the photos were cut out and pasted into the animation in a style recalling Terry Gilliam's work on Monty Python's Flying Circus. Muto also credits the Fleischer Brothers as another inspiration.

=== Music ===
Forbidden Zone was the first film scored by Danny Elfman, who would eventually score, among other films, Pee-wee's Big Adventure, Batman, The Nightmare Before Christmas, and Charlie and the Chocolate Factory. The song Witch's Egg was written by Georg Michalski and Tyrrell. In some scenes, characters lip synch to old records, including recordings by Cab Calloway, Josephine Baker, and others.

The alphabet song performed in a classroom scene was inspired by the "Swinging the Alphabet" song from The Three Stooges short Violent Is the Word for Curly.

For the "Yiddishe Charleston" scene, Richard Elfman had shot the sequence with him lip-syncing to an old recording of the song, but was later unable to acquire the rights to the recording, and had to record a new version of the song while attempting to sync the new recording with the footage.

The film's soundtrack has also become popular, and its theme song was eventually reused by Danny Elfman, who rearranged it as The Dilbert Zone for use as the theme for the television series Dilbert.

== Release and reception ==
Forbidden Zone premiered at the Los Angeles Filmex film festival in 1980. The film played at the New Beverly Cinema as a midnight movie beginning March 28, and added three theatres in San Francisco, Seattle, and Columbus in May. The film received another limited theatrical release through The Samuel Goldwyn Company in 1982. Following its theatrical run, Forbidden Zone fell out of circulation for roughly twenty years, though bootleg recordings helped find the film new life as a highly sought-after and well-regarded cult film. In 2004, Film Threat magazine dubbed Forbidden Zone "the Citizen Kane of underground movies". As of 2024 the film has a score of 83% on review aggregator website Rotten Tomatoes, with an average rating of 6.6/10.

=== Home media ===
The film was digitally restored and released on Region 1 DVD by Fantoma in 2004, receiving a Region 2 release by Arrow Film Distributors Ltd. in 2006. In 2008, with Elfman's blessing and input, a colorized version of Forbidden Zone was issued on DVD by Legend Films, and was later screened in exhibition at the New York Museum of Modern Art in 2010. Arrow released a Blu-Ray edition in the UK in 2012, followed by "Ultimate Edition" North American Blu-Ray and DVD releases by MVD Entertainment Group in 2015; all contained both the black-and-white and color versions.

=== Controversies ===
Upon its original release, Forbidden Zone was criticized for its tongue-in-cheek use of racist, homophobic, antisemitic and anti-Christian visuals and characters. Elfman, himself of Jewish heritage, has disputed many of these accusations, noting that elements seen as homophobic were inspired by his time as a director and occasional performer in the San Francisco avant-garde drag troupe The Cockettes, while the character of "Mr. Bernstein", seemingly an exaggerated Jewish stereotype, was played by Elfman's Jewish grandfather Herman Bernstein, who, Elfman wryly asserted, "wasn't acting".

In particular, Forbidden Zone has been criticized for its brief use of surreal blackface. In 2020, Elfman digitally removed the blackface images and replaced them with "clown-face". In an interview with Dread Central, he explained "Going back to our very first test screening in 1980, there were a few things that really bugged me. The film is an absurdist fever-dream with hundreds of crazy, cartoonish images. I regretted the few seconds of Max Fleischer-era black-face and wanted to change it to 'clown-face'. But the film had – literally – bankrupted me, I had lost control and couldn't complete it exactly the way I wanted. Well, forty years later, I fucking can!". Elfman's director's cut was released in early 2021.

== Legacy ==
=== Sequel ===
In June 2009, it was revealed through an entry on IMDb that Elfman had been developing a sequel to Forbidden Zone entitled Forbidden Zone 2: The Forbidden Galaxy. The prospective project was more formally detailed in March 2014 when Elfman launched a successful crowdfunding campaign on IndieGoGo to raise part of the film's financing. As of May 2023, Elfman confirmed that the project is "still alive" and that he "will not give up on FZ2", describing it as "number one on his bucket list."

=== Stage show ===
In 2010, Forbidden Zone was performed as a live stage show with the support of Richard Elfman. It is a production of the Sacred Fools Theater Company, and premiered there in Los Angeles on Friday, May 21, 2010.

=== Mixed media ===
Richard Elfman entered into a licensing deal with the creative resource company, PANGEA, to provide licensees with the opportunity to create merchandise based on the cult film. According to articles that appeared in the media on May 3, 2016, the arrangement calls for content to be created that will include a Storyboard Book of the original film, featuring commentary and anecdotal notes from director. Shot glasses and sculpted pieces were among the list of immediate items that would be released. A fantasy novella series was also noted as being under development.

Rocky Horror "shadow cast" companies have begun performing screenings of the film. Elfman sometimes participates in these live performances. He enters in a clown suit and beats a big bass drum that is accompanied by a Brazilian percussion ensemble—reminiscent of his former group, the Mystic Knights of the Oingo Boingo.

The Syfy Channel has run a teaser piece musical number, "Princess Polly" from Forbidden Zone 2: The Forbidden Galaxy on its show The Monster Man, starring Cleve Hall. Elfman opens the Forbidden Zone shadow cast shows (after the march in) with Erin Holt singing Princess Polly live in front of her screened “monster” image on stage.
