= Marc Mann =

American musician

Marc Mann is an American keyboardist, guitarist, programmer, arranger and conductor. He has a Master's Degree in Music from UCLA. Mann is known for his work with Oingo Boingo, Jeff Lynne and the Electric Light Orchestra.

Mann is credited as performer, arranger or producer on 54 albums. He is a long-time collaborator with Danny Elfman in such films as the Men in Black series, Mars Attacks!, Sleepy Hollow, plus many more. He is usually credited for MIDI supervision and some orchestrations.

== Selected work ==
Mann was supposed to play with the Electric Light Orchestra on their tour for the promotion of their album Zoom, but the tour was cancelled.

Mann played keyboards for Oingo Boingo (another collaboration with Elfman) from 1994 to 1995 and performed on their final live album and video release Live from the Universal Amphitheatre.

In January 1994, Mann was hired by Lynne to help clean a few of John Lennon's cassettes, that the remaining Beatles Paul McCartney, George Harrison and Ringo Starr had finished with, and turned a few songs into Beatles songs.

In 2002, Mann made string arrangements for several songs on Harrison's posthumous Brainwashed album. On November 29, 2002, Mann performed in the Concert for George alongside Eric Clapton, Jeff Lynne, Billy Preston, Ringo Starr, Paul McCartney and many others, playing Harrison's parts. In 2004, Mann played lead guitar along with Prince on the song "While My Guitar Gently Weeps" when Harrison was inducted posthumously into the Rock and Roll Hall of Fame.

Since then, Mann has continued his collaboration with Lynne and Elfman, being credited for involvement in films such as Frankenweenie and Mr. Peabody & Sherman, as well as providing support for bands like Thenewno2. Mann is also guitarist, singer, and arranger for The Tribe, a revolving group of Los Angeles musicians and singers that includes Stephen John Kalinich, Freebo, Fuzzbee Morse, Gary Stockdale, Grant Geissman, Carly Smithson, Rosemary Butler, Gary Griffin, The Honeys, and Band Manager Lauri Reimer.
