= Georganne Deen =

American artist, poet and musician

Georganne Deen (born 1951 in Fort Worth, Texas) is an American artist, poet and musician. She now lives and works in Joshua Tree, California.

== Solo exhibitions ==
- 2013 Brand 10, Fort Worth, Texas, forever eve
- 2012 Webb Gallery, Waxahachie, Texas, Song of Myself
- 2011 VAN HORN, Düsseldorf, Once Upon a Stratum of Consciousness
- 2009 VAN HORN, Düsseldorf, The Dramatic Upheaval & Ultimate Fall of the Status Quo
- 2008 Smith-Stewart, New York, The Love That Has No Opposite
- 2007 VAN HORN, Düsseldorf, The Devil's Daughter
- 2004 Mixture Contemporary Art, Houston, Texas, The Heroine's Trip
- 2003 Lizabeth Oliveria Gallery, San Francisco, California, Western Witch, Season of the
- 2002 The MAC, Dallas, Texas, Georganne Deen: 1992–2002
- 2002 Barry Whistler Gallery, Dallas, Texas, I Gave it All Away for Love
- 2002 Mixture Contemporary Art, Houston, Texas, The New Alchemy (From Shit City)
- 2001 Babilonia 1808, Berkeley, California, The Secret Storm
- 2000 Waikato Museum of Art, Hamilton, New Zealand, 15 Psychic Orgasms
- 1999 Dunedin Public Art Gallery, Dunedin, New Zealand
- 1998 Christopher Grimes Gallery, Santa Monica, California, Un Fuc Me (and let me live again)
- 1998 The Power Plant Public Art Gallery, Toronto, Ontario, Georganne Deen
- 1997 The Guggenheim Gallery at Chapman University, Los Angeles, California, Georganne Deen
- 1996 Christopher Grimes Gallery, Santa Monica, California, The Mind Hospital
- 1994 Christopher Grimes Gallery, Santa Monica, California, The Mother Load
- 1988 La Luz de Jesus Gallery, Los Angeles, California, Crying Game
- 1981 Zero Zero Gallery, Los Angeles, California, Georganne Deen

== Publications ==
- 5000 Jahre Moderne Kunst – Painting, Smoking, Eating, Hrsg. Andreas Baur für die Galerien der Stadt Esslingen am Neckar, 96 S., farb. und s/w Abb., Texte von Andreas Baur, Andreas Baur/Marcus Weber, Andreas Seltzer, Georg Baselitz, Hansjörg Fröhlich ISBN 978-3-940748-48-5
- Blasted Allegories: Werke aus der Sammlung Ringier, Kunstmuseum Luzern 2008 ISBN 3905829401
- Western Witch, Season of the foreword by Thurston Moore, Perceval Press 2003 ISBN 0972143653
- The Godfrey Daniels School of Charm at Track 16, Smart Art Press and Western Witch 2002
- Georganne Deen 1992–2002 essay by Doug Harvey catalogue from The McKinney Avenue Contemporary, Dallas Tex. 2002
- Georganne Deen catalogue from The Power Plant, essay by Philip Monk, Toronto Ontario Canada 1998
- Georganne Deen an Exhibition of Paintings essays by Michael Duncan, Amy Gerstler Smart Art Press Santa Monica California
- If That's All You Can Remember, poetry and paintings Studio Camuffo Venezia 1997

== Sources ==
- Behrens, Katja "Verspielter Exorzismus", TAZ nrw, 20. March 2007
- Wertheim, Christine "Georganne Deen: Underground Woman" X-tra Winter 2006
- Harvey, Doug "I Art the 80's" L.A. Weekly, March 2006
- Fahl, David "Text Hook" Houston Press, June 17, 2004
- Klaasmeyer, Kelly, Deen's List" Houston Press, Jan.2, 2003
- Lowry, Mark, "Artist's Work Hits Close to Home" Fort Worth Star Telegram, Mar. 13, 2002
- Mitchell, Charles Dee, "Self Examination Turns Disturbing" The Dallas Morning News Feb. 28, 2002
- Deen, Georganne, "The Girlfriend and The Devil" Grand Street #70
- Halstrup, Anjee "Georganne Deen: The Secret Storm and the Vogue Book of the Dead" ZERO magazine July 2001
- Rodriguez, Juan "Georganne Deen at Babilonia 1808" Artweek June 2001
- McEwam, Ann "15 Psychic Orgasms" Waitako Times Mar 8, 2000
