= Sam Phipps =

American saxophone player (born 1953)

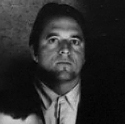
- Phipps in 1987

Background information
- Also known as: Sluggo Phipps
- Born: October 1, 1953 (age 73); Los Angeles, California, United States
- Genres: New wave, rock, alternative rock, ska, avant-garde jazz
- Occupation: Musician
- Instruments: Saxophone, clarinet, percussion
- Years active: 1973–present

Sam "Sluggo" Phipps (born October 1, 1953) is an American saxophone player, best known for being a member of the new wave band Oingo Boingo.

== Early life ==
Sam Phipps was born in Los Angeles, California, on October 1, 1953. He played piano and trombone from an early age, but an interest in surf rock led him to begin playing saxophone at the age of 15. Between 1971 and 1972, Phipps attended Berklee College of Music in Boston.

Prior to the formation of Oingo Boingo, Phipps met future members Danny Elfman and Leon Schneiderman while they were friends of his sister.

== Career ==
=== Music ===
While performing in Europe with singer and pianist Annette Peacock, Phipps was contacted by Richard Elfman and asked to return to the United States to play with the then theater group The Mystic Knights of the Oingo Boingo. He played tenor and soprano saxophone, clarinet, flute, percussion, and provided occasional backing vocals for Oingo Boingo from 1973 until the band's breakup in 1995. Oingo Boingo's odd mixture of pop, rock, ska, and varying world musical styles often featured the band's brass and woodwind instruments, giving Phipps the opportunity to perform solos that are reminiscent of the band's more theatrical and traditional origins. During the early years of Oingo Boingo, Phipps recorded an album of original avant-garde jazz compositions entitled Animal Sounds with pianist John Larkin.

Following the breakup of Oingo Boingo, Phipps, along with Oingo Boingo members John Avila, Steve Bartek, Johnny "Vatos" Hernandez, and Doug Lacy formed the rock group Doug & the Mystics, who released their first and currently only album in 1995.

Although former Oingo Boingo frontman Danny Elfman has stated that there will not be a full reunion, several other members, including Phipps, continue to perform with the band Oingo Boingo Former Members, led by drummer Johnny Vatos, playing songs from their Oingo Boingo career with vocalist Brendan McCreary.

=== Film and television ===
Phipps appeared as a member of Satan's band, alongside The Mystic Knights of the Oingo Boingo, in the 1980 film Forbidden Zone during the group's transformation period between being a theater group and becoming a rock band. With Oingo Boingo, he appeared in the Rodney Dangerfield film Back to School, the punk documentary Urgh! A Music War, and Longshot, as well as the music videos included in The Best of Oingo Boingo: Skeletons in the Closet and Farewell: Live from the Universal Amphitheater, Halloween 1995. He also had a cameo alongside bandmate Steve Bartek in the 1998 comedy film Meet the Deedles, for which Bartek composed original music.
