= Dale Turner (trumpeter) =

American trumpet player

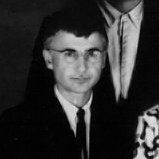
- Turner in 1987

Background information
- Genres: New wave, rock, ska
- Occupation: Musician
- Instruments: Trumpet, trombone
- Formerly of: Oingo Boingo

Dale Turner is an American trumpet player, best known for being a member of the American new wave band Oingo Boingo.

== Career ==
=== Music ===
Turner was a member of Oingo Boingo for the band's entire existence, from 1972 to 1995. Although primarily playing trumpet, he also played trombone, guitar, and percussion, and provided backing vocals for the band. According to former front man Danny Elfman in 1983, Turner "keeps an eye on us and makes sure that we don't get too far out of hand" and "he could spank every one of them [...]", with the exception of saxophonist Sam "Sluggo" Phipps.

He has also performed with Garth Hudson, including a track on the Raging Bull soundtrack.

=== Television and film ===
Turner appeared with Oingo Boingo in the feature film Back to School, the film Urgh! A Music War, Longshot, and the videos for the albums The Best of Oingo Boingo: Skeletons in the Closet and Farewell: Live from the Universal Amphitheater, Halloween 1995.
