= John Avila =

American bassist and music producer (born 1957)

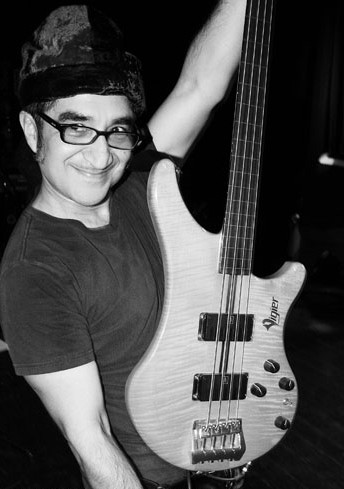
- John Avila at the House of Blues, April 7, 2006

Background information
- Born: John Avila; January 14, 1957 (age 69); San Gabriel, California
- Genres: Rock, hard rock, new wave, ska, alternative rock, Chicano rock
- Occupation: Musician
- Instrument: Bass guitar
- Years active: 1978–present
- Formerly of: Oingo Boingo

John Avila (born January 14, 1957) is an American bassist and music producer, best known for being in the new wave band Oingo Boingo from 1984 to 1995. John is currently touring with Walter Trout.

== Career ==
Avila co-founded the music group Food for Feet in 1981, and played with them until 1991.

In 1984, he joined Oingo Boingo, replacing bassist Kerry Hatch. He played with Oingo Boingo until 1995. Avila has worked with many other musical acts including Psychotic Aztecs and Neville Staple in his backing band The Hitmen. Avila owns and operates the recording studio, Brando's Paradise. He is currently the bass player in the Los Angeles–based multi-media group the Mutaytor and The Gama Sennin.
