= Danny Elfman =

American composer (born 1953)

- Elfman in 2026
- Born: Daniel Robert Elfman; May 29, 1953 (age 73); Los Angeles, California, U.S.
- Occupations: Composer; singer; songwriter; musician
- Years active: 1971–present
- Spouse(s): Geri Eisenmenger (divorced) Bridget Fonda (m. 2003)
- Children: 3
- Mother: Blossom Elfman
- Relatives: Richard Elfman (brother); Bodhi Elfman (nephew)
- Musical career
- Genres: Film score; pop; new wave; contemporary classical music
- Formerly of: Oingo Boingo
- Website: dannyelfman.com

Daniel Robert Elfman (born May 29, 1953) is an American film composer and musician. Since scoring his first studio film in 1985, he has garnered international recognition for composing over 100 feature film scores as well as compositions for television, stage productions, and the concert hall. He originally came to prominence as the lead vocalist and primary songwriter for the new wave band Oingo Boingo in the early 1980s.

Elfman has frequently worked with directors Tim Burton, Sam Raimi, and Gus Van Sant, contributing music to nearly 20 Burton projects, including Pee-Wee's Big Adventure, Beetlejuice, Batman, Edward Scissorhands, Batman Returns, Mars Attacks!, Sleepy Hollow, Big Fish, and Alice in Wonderland, as well as scoring Raimi's Darkman, A Simple Plan, Spider-Man, Spider-Man 2, Oz the Great and Powerful, and Doctor Strange in the Multiverse of Madness, and Van Sant's Academy Award-winning films Good Will Hunting and Milk. He wrote music for all of the Men in Black and Fifty Shades of Grey franchise films, the songs and score for Henry Selick's animated musical The Nightmare Before Christmas, the score for the animated film Meet the Robinsons, and the themes for the popular television series Desperate Housewives and The Simpsons.

Among his honors are four Oscar nominations, three Emmy Awards, a Grammy, seven Saturn Awards for Best Music, the 2002 Richard Kirk Award, the 2015 Disney Legend Award, the Max Steiner Film Music Achievement Award in 2017, and the Society of Composers & Lyricists Lifetime Achievement Award in 2022.

== Early life ==
Daniel Robert Elfman was born on May 29, 1953 in Los Angeles, California to a Jewish family of Russian-Jewish descent. He is a son of Blossom Elfman (née Bernstein), a novelist, and Milton Elfman, a teacher. He is the brother of actor, musician, and journalist Richard Elfman. Elfman was raised in an affluent, racially-mixed community in Baldwin Hills, California, where he spent much of his time at the local movie theater discovering classic sci-fi, fantasy and horror films and first noticed the music of such film composers as Bernard Herrmann and Franz Waxman. Elfman has admitted to fabricating stories about his past out of boredom, including a false birthplace of Amarillo, Texas, and parents who served in the United States Air Force.

In his early school days, Elfman exhibited an aptitude for science with almost no interest in music, and was even rejected from elementary school orchestra "for having no propensity for music." This would change when he switched high schools in the late 1960s and fell in with a musical crowd, who introduced him to early jazz and the work of Stravinsky and his 20th-century contemporaries. Elfman attended University High School in Los Angeles before dropping out.

Elfman left school to follow his brother Richard to France, where he performed violin with Jérôme Savary's Le Grand Magic Circus, an avant-garde musical theater group. He then embarked on a ten-month, self-guided tour through Africa, busking and collecting a range of West African percussion instruments until a series of illnesses forced him to return home. At this time, Richard was forming a new musical theater group in Los Angeles.

== Career ==
=== Oingo Boingo ===
After returning to Los Angeles from Africa in the early 1970s, Elfman was asked by his brother Richard to serve as musical director of his street theatre performance art troupe The Mystic Knights of the Oingo Boingo. Elfman was tasked with adapting and arranging 1920s and 1930s jazz and big band music by artists such as Cab Calloway, Duke Ellington, Django Reinhardt and Josephine Baker for the ensemble, which consisted of up to 15 performers playing upwards of 30 instruments. He also composed original pieces and helped build instruments unique for the group, including an aluminum gamelan, the 'Schlitz celeste' made from tuned beer cans, and a "junkyard orchestra" built from car parts and trash cans.

The Mystic Knights performed on the street and in theaters, and later in nightclubs throughout Los Angeles until Richard left in 1976 to pursue filmmaking. As a send-off to the group's original concept, Richard produced the film Forbidden Zone based on the Mystic Knights' stage performances. Elfman composed the songs and his first score for the film, and appeared as the character Satan, who performs a reworked version of Calloway's "Minnie the Moocher."

Before the release of Forbidden Zone, Elfman took over the Mystic Knights as lead singer-songwriter in 1976. In 1979, he pared the group down to eight players to record and tour as a ska-influenced new wave band. That summer, the group's name would change to Oingo Boingo. Their biggest success among eight studio albums penned by Elfman was 1985's Dead Man's Party, featuring the hit song "Weird Science" from the movie of the same name. The band also appeared performing their single "Dead Man's Party" in the 1986 movie Back to School, for which Elfman also composed the score. Elfman shifted the band to a more guitar-oriented rock sound in the late 1980s, which continued through their last album Boingo in 1994.

Citing permanent hearing damage from performing live and conflicts with his film-scoring career, Elfman retired Oingo Boingo in 1995 with a series of five sold-out final concerts at the Universal Amphitheatre ending on Halloween night. On October 31, 2015, Elfman and Oingo Boingo guitarist Steve Bartek performed the song "Dead Man's Party" with an orchestra as an encore to a live-to-film concert of The Nightmare Before Christmas score at the Hollywood Bowl. Elfman told the audience the performance was "20 years to the day" of Oingo Boingo's retirement.

=== Film scoring ===
As fans of Oingo Boingo, Tim Burton and Paul Reubens invited Elfman to write the score for their first feature film Pee-wee's Big Adventure in 1985. Elfman was initially apprehensive because of his lack of formal training and having never scored a studio feature, but after Burton accepted his initial demo of the title music, and with orchestration assistance from Oingo Boingo guitarist and arranger Steve Bartek, Elfman completed the score to great effect, paying homage to influential film composers Nino Rota and Bernard Herrmann. Elfman described the first time he heard his music played by a full orchestra as one of the most thrilling experiences of his life.

Following Pee Wee's Big Adventure, Elfman scored a string of comedies in the late 1980s, including Back to School starring Rodney Dangerfield, Burton's Beetlejuice and the Bill Murray film Scrooged. Non-comedy work included the all-synth score to Emilio Estevez's crime drama Wisdom and the big band, blues-infused music for Martin Brest's buddy cop action film Midnight Run.

In 1989, Elfman's influential, Grammy-winning score for Burton's Batman marked a major stylistic shift to dark, densely orchestrated music in the romantic idiom. This continued in his scores for Warren Beatty's Dick Tracy, Sam Raimi's Darkman and Clive Barker's Nightbreed, all released in 1990.

With Batman, Elfman firmly established a career-spanning relationship with Burton, scoring all but three of the director's major studio releases. Highlights include Edward Scissorhands (1990), Batman Returns (1992), Sleepy Hollow (1999), Big Fish (2003) and Alice in Wonderland (2010). In 1993, Elfman wrote the score and ten songs for the Burton-produced stop motion animated film The Nightmare Before Christmas, directed by Henry Selick, and also provided the singing voice for main character Jack Skellington, as well as the voices for secondary characters Barrel, the Clown with the Tear-Away Face and others. In 2005, he wrote the score and songs for Burton's Corpse Bride and provided the voice of the character of Bonejangles, and provided the score, songs and Oompa-Loompa vocals for Burton's Charlie and the Chocolate Factory that same year.

In addition to frequent collaborations with Burton, Raimi and Gus Van Sant, Elfman has worked with directors such as Brian De Palma, Peter Jackson, Joss Whedon, Errol Morris, Ang Lee, Richard Donner, Guillermo del Toro, David O. Russell, Taylor Hackford, Jon Amiel, Joe Johnston, and Barry Sonnenfeld. His scores for Sonnenfeld's Men in Black, Van Sant's Good Will Hunting and Milk, and Burton's Big Fish all received Academy Award nominations.

Since the mid-1990s, Elfman expanded his craft to a range of genres, including thrillers (Dolores Claiborne, A Simple Plan, The Kingdom, The Girl on the Train, The Woman in the Window), dramas (Sommersby, A Civil Action, Hitchcock), indies (Freeway, Silver Linings Playbook, Don't Worry, He Won't Get Far on Foot, White Noise), family (Flubber, Charlotte's Web, Frankenweenie, Goosebumps, Dolittle), documentary (Standard Operating Procedure, The Unknown Known), and horror (Red Dragon, The Wolfman), as well as entries in his well-established areas of horror comedy (The Frighteners, Mars Attacks!, Dark Shadows) and comic book-inspired action films (Hulk, Wanted, Hellboy II: The Golden Army).

Among his franchise work, Elfman composed the scores for four Men in Black films (1997–2019) and three Fifty Shades films (2015–2018). In 1996, he scored the first film in the Mission: Impossible series, adapting themes for the original television series by Lalo Schifrin as well as composing his own. Elfman scored Raimi's Spider-Man in 2002 and Spider-Man 2 in 2004, themes and selections from which were used for Raimi's Spider-Man 3, scored by Christopher Young. Elfman's Spider-Man theme was incorporated into the MCU film Spider-Man: No Way Home composed by Michael Giacchino. In 2007, he scored the Disney animated film Meet the Robinsons, taking inspiration from other cartoon composers like Carl Stalling (who was responsible for most of the music for the original Looney Tunes and Merrie Melodies cartoons).

Elfman entered the Marvel Cinematic Universe by providing additional music in 2015's Avengers: Age of Ultron, receiving composer credit with Brian Tyler. Elfman also scored MCU's Doctor Strange in the Multiverse of Madness in 2022, utilizing Giacchino's theme to the original Doctor Strange film, as well as themes from WandaVision and X-Men: The Animated Series, and music from Beethoven's Fifth Symphony and Bach's Toccata and Fugue.

For several high-profile sequel and reboot projects in the 2010s, Elfman incorporated established musical themes with his own original thematic material, including the DC Extended Universe's Justice League, The Grinch Dumbo and Men in Black International.

Elfman was featured in the 2016 documentary Score, in which he appeared among over 50 film composers to discuss the craft of movie music and influential figures in the business.

In 2025, he composed the music for Luc Besson's big-budget French film Dracula.

=== Concert music ===
Elfman's first piece of original concert music, Serenada Schizophrana, was commissioned by the American Composers Orchestra, who premiered the piece on February 23, 2005, at Carnegie Hall. Subsequent concert works include his first Violin Concerto "Eleven Eleven", co-commissioned by the Czech National Symphony Orchestra, Stanford Live at Stanford University, and the Royal Scottish National Orchestra, which premiered at Smetana Hall in Prague on June 21, 2017, with Sandy Cameron on violin and John Mauceri conducting the Czech National Symphony Orchestra; the Piano Quartet, co-commissioned by the Lied Center for Performing Arts, University of Nebraska–Lincoln, and the Berlin Philharmonic Piano Quartet, which premiered February 6, 2018, in Lincoln, Nebraska; and the Percussion Quartet, commissioned by Third Coast Percussion and premiered at the Philip Glass Days And Nights Festival in Big Sur on October 10, 2019.

2022 saw the first performances of three concert works. Elfman's Cello Concerto for Gautier Capuçon was premiered by the Vienna Symphony on March 18, with subsequent performances by the Orchestre Philharmonique de Radio France in May and the San Francisco Symphony US premiere in November. Elfman's Percussion Concerto for Colin Currie premiered on March 25 at London's Royal Festival Hall with London Philharmonic Orchestra, and was later performed at Soka University of America in California, with Pacific Symphony. His Wunderkammer, a commission from the National Youth Orchestra of Great Britain, toured the UK in summer 2022, culminating in a performance in London's Royal Albert Hall as part of the BBC Proms, with national radio and TV broadcasts.

Elfman's Suite for Chamber Orchestra was premiered on May 4, 2023, by Orpheus Chamber Orchestra at St Mark's Episcopal Church in Washington, D.C. The Suite was co-commissioned by the Library of Congress, the Royalty Pool of Andre Kostelanetz, the Los Angeles Chamber Orchestra, and the National Symphony Orchestra of Ireland. Subsequent performances of the Suite include the New York premiere by the Orpheus Chamber Orchestra in July 2023 at 92NY's inaugural MidSummer Music Fest, the West Coast premiere by the Los Angeles Chamber Orchestra in December 2023 at the Alex Theatre in Glendale, California, and a performance by the Reno Chamber Orchestra in October 2024.

=== Stage music ===
In 2008, Elfman accepted his first commission for the stage, composing the music for Twyla Tharp's Rabbit and Rogue ballet, co-commissioned by American Ballet Theatre and Orange County Performing Arts Center and premiering on June 3, 2008, at the Metropolitan Opera House, Lincoln Center. Other works for stage include the music for Cirque Du Soleil's Iris in 2011, and incidental music for the Broadway production of Taylor Mac's Gary: A Sequel to Titus Andronicus in 2019.

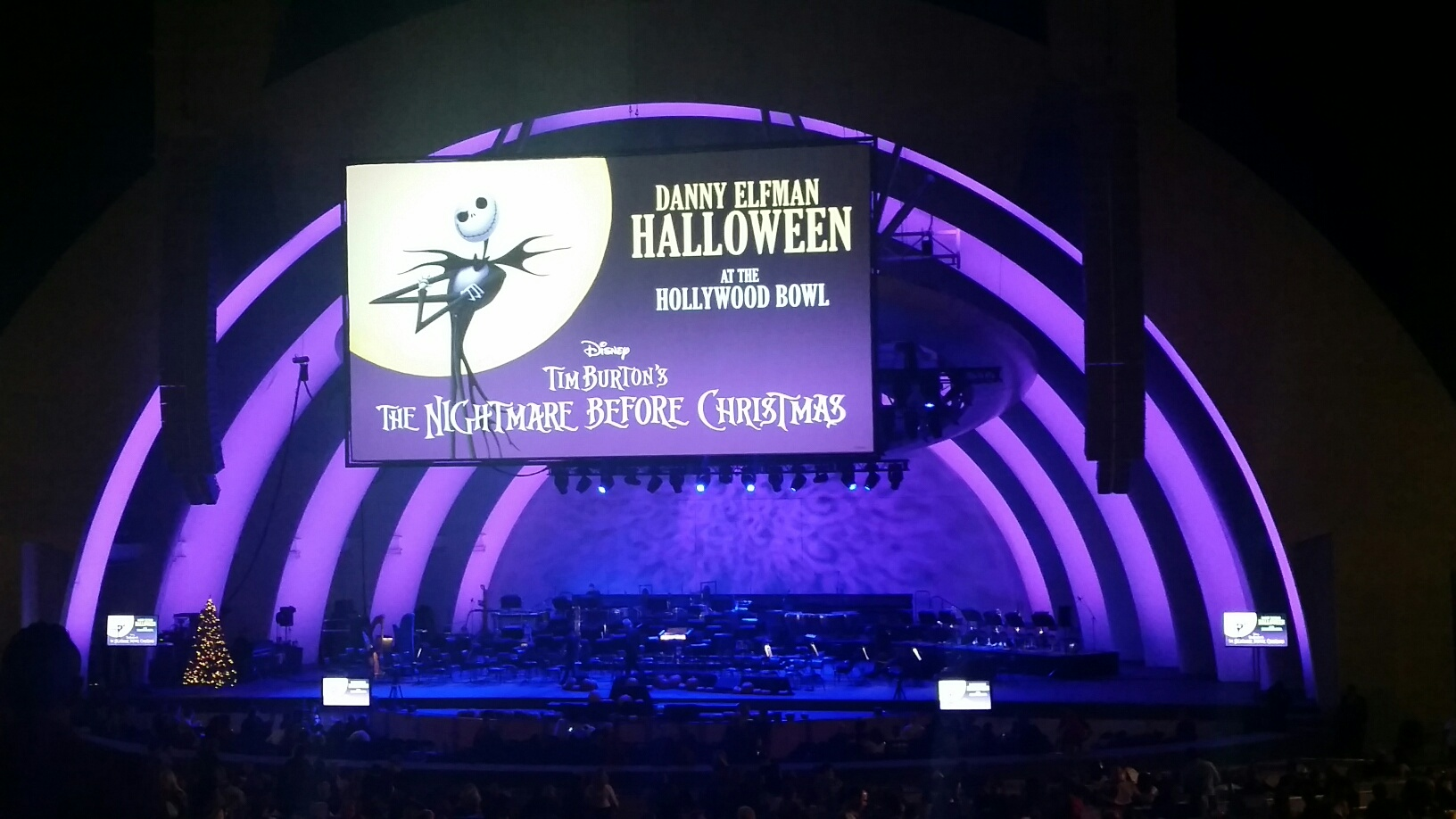
Elfman's The Nightmare Before Christmas live at the Hollywood Bowl.

In October 2013, Elfman returned to the stage for the first time since his band Oingo Boingo disbanded to sing a handful of The Nightmare Before Christmas songs as part of the concert Danny Elfman's Music from the Films of Tim Burton, featuring suites of music from 15 Tim Burton films newly arranged by Elfman. The concert has since toured internationally and has played in Japan, Australia, Mexico and throughout Europe and the United States. Since 2015, Elfman has appeared regularly in a Hollywood Bowl Halloween concert featuring full orchestra performing the Nightmare Before Christmas score live to the film projection. In 2025, he reprised his singing role as Jack Skellington for the 10th anniversary of the live version, which starred Janelle Monáe, Keith David and John Stamos.

Elfman made his Coachella debut on April 16, 2022, with Danny Elfman: From Boingo to Batman to Big Mess to Beyond! The concert, postponed from Coachella 2020 due to the COVID-19 pandemic, featured Elfman's film and television music arranged for band, orchestra and choir, as well as songs from his solo album Big Mess and new arrangements of songs from his Oingo Boingo catalogue. Conducted by Steve Bartek, and featuring Elfman (vocals, guitar, percussion), Wes Borland (guitar), Stu Brooks (bass), Nili Brosh (guitar), and Josh Freese (drums), the concert was expanded for two shows Halloween weekend 2022 at the Hollywood Bowl.

=== Television and other projects ===
In addition to his music for film, Elfman also penned themes for the television series The Simpsons, Tales from the Crypt, The Flash and Desperate Housewives, which won Elfman his first Emmy. He also adapted his original themes for the animated versions of Batman and Beetlejuice. Occasional forays into serial television include episodes of Alfred Hitchcock Presents, Amazing Stories and Pee-wee's Playhouse, the miniseries When We Rise co-composed with Chris Bacon, and themes for the Netflix series Wednesday.

He has composed music for animated shorts, including Sally Cruikshank's Face Like A Frog and Tim Burton's "Stainboy" internet series.

Elfman provided background music for Luigi Serafini's solo exhibition il Teatro della Pittura at the Fondazione Mudima di Milano in Milan, Italy in 1998 and for the Tim Burton exhibition at MoMA in 2009.

In the 1990s, Elfman composed music for advertising campaigns for Nike, Nissan and Lincoln-Mercury, and in 2002 wrote the music for Honda's "Power of Dreams" advertising campaign, which was the first cinema commercial to be shot in the IMAX format.

In 2013 he composed the music and provided the English-language vocals for the Hong Kong Disneyland attraction Mystic Manor.

On October 31, 2019, the MasterClass online educational series released "Making Music out of Chaos," presenting 21 compositional and career lessons from Elfman's four decades of experience primarily in the film industry.

Elfman scored the 10-minute video "Joe Biden," which introduced Joe Biden's acceptance of the presidential candidacy nomination at the 2020 Democratic National Convention.

On November 16, 2021, Disney Branded Television announced that Elfman would compose score and songs of the upcoming Disney Television Animation and 20th Television Animation stop-motion animated comedy series Rhona Who Lives by the River created by Emily Kapnek, Elfman also serves as executive producer for the series.

In June 2024, it was announced that Elfman would compose the music for the Dark Universe section of Universal Epic Universe.

On January 17, 2026, Elfman made his first appearance on Saturday Night Live, performing drums with A$AP Rocky during the song "Punk Rocky". Bassist Thundercat also performed. The appearance marked Elfman's SNL debut despite his decades-long career in music, as Oingo Boingo had primarily been a West Coast act and never received an invitation to appear on the show.

=== Solo ===
In October 2020, Elfman released the single, "Happy," on Anti- Records and Epitaph Records. From January 2021 on the eleventh day of each month, he released five subsequent singles "Sorry", "Love in the Time of COVID", "Kick Me", "True", and a reworking of the Oingo Boingo song "Insects" from the album Nothing to Fear. This culminated with the release of the double album Big Mess on June 11. Featuring 18 original songs, this was Elfman's first solo studio album since 1984's So-Lo.

On August 11, 2021, Elfman released a remix of "True" with lead vocals shared between Elfman and Nine Inch Nails frontman Trent Reznor. A year later, Elfman released Bigger Messier, a compilation of 23 remixes of songs on the album Big Mess by artists including Reznor, Iggy Pop, Blixa Bargeld, Squarepusher, Boy Harsher and more. A further solo album was announced by Elfman on his social media pages in 2025.

== Influences and style ==
Elfman has said his major influences are composers from Hollywood's Golden Age, such as Bernard Herrmann, Dimitri Tiomkin, Max Steiner, David Tamkin, Erich Wolfgang Korngold, and Carl Stalling; 20th century classical composers Sergei Prokofiev, Igor Stravinsky, Béla Bartók, Dmitri Shostakovich, and Carl Orff; and jazz, experimental and minimalist composers Kurt Weill, Duke Ellington, Harry Partch, Philip Glass, Lou Harrison, Terry Riley, and Steve Reich.

Influences on specific scores include Erik Satie (Forbidden Zone), Nino Rota (Pee-wee's Big Adventure), George Gershwin (Dick Tracy), Pyotr Ilyich Tchaikovsky (Edward Scissorhands), and Jimi Hendrix (Dead Presidents). Though not considered direct influences per se, Elfman has discussed his respect and admiration for film composers Jerry Goldsmith, Ennio Morricone, Thomas Newman, Alexandre Desplat and John Williams, as well as classical composer John Adams.

Though many believe Richard Wagner informed his influential score to Batman, Elfman has said it was more likely from Wagner's influence on classic film composers such as Herrmann, Steiner, Waxman and Korngold, as he was unfamiliar with Wagner's work at the time.

Elfman counts Herrmann as his biggest influence, and has said hearing Herrmann's score to The Day the Earth Stood Still when he was a child was the first time he recognized film music as a cinematic art form and realized the powerful contribution a composer makes to the movies. Pastiche of Herrmann's music can be heard in Elfman's Pee-wee's Big Adventure, especially the cues "Stolen Bike" and "Clown Dream", which directly reference Herrmann's music from Psycho and The 7th Voyage of Sinbad respectively. His score to Batman makes more subtle nods to Herrmann's Journey to the Center of the Earth and Vertigo, and more integral homage can be heard in later scores for Mars Attacks! and Hitchcock, as well as the "Blue Strings" movement of his first concert work Serenada Schizophrana.

While Elfman is primarily known for writing large-scale orchestral works in the romantic, 20th century and Hollywood Golden Age film score traditions, his compositions have used a wide range of idioms, including rock and blues (Midnight Run, Hot to Trot), big band and jazz (Dick Tracy, Chicago), operetta (The Nightmare Before Christmas, Corpse Bride), funk and hip-hop (Dead Presidents, Notorious), folk and indie rock (Taking Woodstock, Silver Linings Playbook), Americana (Article 99, Sommersby, Big Fish), minimalism (Good Will Hunting, Standard Operating Procedure, The Unknown Known), and atonal or experimental (Freeway, A Simple Plan, The Girl on the Train).

Given his appreciation and study of world music and his vast collection of instruments from non-Western cultures, Elfman will often use traditional instruments in his scores when there is an international setting, such as African percussion for Instinct, the oud for The Kingdom set in Saudi Arabia, and pan flute for Proof of Life set in South America.

When working on films with established musical identifiers, Elfman will often incorporate original themes in addition to his own thematic material. Examples include Lalo Schifrin's main theme and "The Plot" from the original Mission Impossible TV Series for Mission: Impossible; John Williams' theme for Superman, the Hans Zimmer/Junkie XL theme for Wonder Woman and his own original Batman theme for Justice League; the "Welcome Christmas" song from the 1966 How the Grinch Stole Christmas! for The Grinch; and "Casey Junior," "Pink Elephants on Parade," and "When I See an Elephant Fly" from Disney's original 1941 animated film for Dumbo.

The songs for The Nightmare Before Christmas and Corpse Bride were influenced by Kurt Weill, Gilbert and Sullivan and early Rodgers and Hammerstein. At the request of Tim Burton, Charlie and the Chocolate Factory songs drew inspiration from Bollywood, the Mamas and the Papas, ABBA, and Earth, Wind & Fire individually.

Elfman's work in pop music and specifically as songwriter for Oingo Boingo was influenced by the Specials, Madness, the Selecter, Devo, Fun Boy Three, and XTC.

== Methods ==
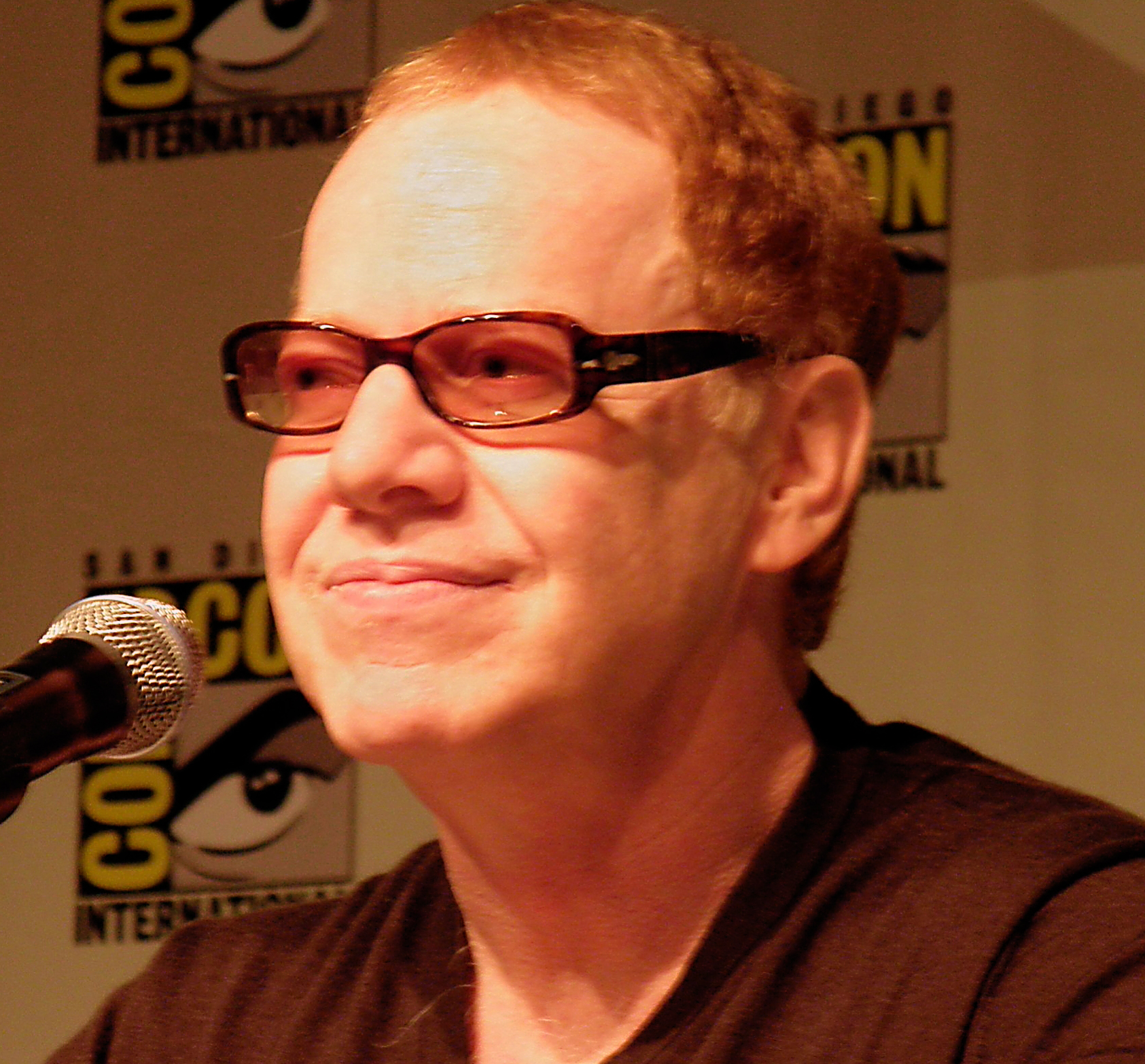
Elfman in 2010

=== Film music ===
For his film scores, Elfman draws musical inspiration almost exclusively from viewing a cut of the film, and occasionally from visits to the set while the film is in production (he wrote and orchestrated his theme for Batman on an airplane to Los Angeles after visiting the set in London). While he prefers not to work from script, story or concept, exceptions include The Nightmare Before Christmas, for which ten songs needed to be written in advance of filmmaking, and Dumbo, for which he composed the main theme before filming began.

Once a rough cut of the film is ready, Elfman and the director have a spotting session to decide where to place music in the film, the emotional undercurrents of each scene, and overall tone. Elfman then spends a few weeks of free composition and experimentation to begin working out thematic material and to develop sounds and the harmonic palette.

When he has received approval on initial material from the filmmakers, Elfman begins to compose anywhere from 60 to 120 minutes of music cue-by-cue. He says two of the most important things to capture at this point are the tone of each scene and editorial rhythm. Next to thematic development, action set pieces tend to take Elfman the most time given the complexity of timing music to action.

Early in his career, he wrote out his scores using pencil, but has composed largely digitally since the mid-1990s.

Before recording the score, he demos each cue by mocking orchestral and choral parts on synthesizer to get approval from the director. Once approved, he provides a detailed, multi-line sketch of his composition to his lead orchestrator Steve Bartek, who ensures the sketches are appropriately broken down for sections of the orchestra (i.e. string, brass woodwind, some percussion), choir (SATB) and individual players.

Elfman also typically samples or records his own percussion and guitar playing to overlay with live orchestra. More than half of some scores feature Elfman's performance, including Dead Presidents, Mission: Impossible, Planet of the Apes, The Kingdom, The Girl on the Train and The Circle.

To produce the score, Elfman rents a recording studio and hires a conductor and orchestra/choir. He oversees the recording from the control booth so that he can troubleshoot with the film's director and recording engineers. The final recording is given to the film's sound department to mix with dialogue and sound effects for the film's complete soundtrack. Elfman will usually do a separate mix of select cues for an album presentation of the score, and has produced nearly 100 to date.

On the occasion that there are compressed deadlines or in the event he is not available to rescore or adapt his music if there are major edits to the film after the score's completion, Elfman will hire additional composers to work on small cues or sections of cues, adapting his existing material or themes. Examples include Jonathan Sheffer on Darkman, David Buckley on the Fifty Shades films, and Pinar Toprak on Justice League. Since the 1990s, Elfman has occasionally co-composed music or shared music writing credit (e.g.When We Rise, Spy Kids, Avengers: Age of Ultron, Men in Black International), or written themes that are then used or adapted by other composers, including Jonathan Sheffer (Pure Luck), Steve Bartek (Novacaine), John Debney (Heartbreakers), Deborah Lurie (9), and the Newton Brothers (Before I Wake).

Elfman has only collaborated once with another artist: Siouxsie and the Banshees, on the song "Face to Face" for Batman Returns in 1992. It was a long-distance collaboration, as the studio needed the song very quickly; Siouxsie created the foundation of the song and sent it to Elfman, who added elements, and the two would send the track back and forth. Regarding collaboration, Elfman would later state, "I'm not used to collaborating at all with anybody. I did one track with Siouxsie and the Banshees but that's it. I've always been in my own bubble, and that bubble has been very fertile".

=== Concert music ===
In the liner notes for the 2006 CD recording of his first concert work Serenada Schizophrana, Elfman wrote: "I began composing several dozen short improvisational compositions, maybe a minute each. Slowly, some of them began to develop themselves until finally I had six separate movements that, in some abstract, absurd way, felt connected."

To create the cadenzas for his violin concerto Eleven Eleven, Elfman collaborated with soloist Sandy Cameron, for whom the piece was written.

=== Vocals ===
Elfman often incorporates choral or vocal arrangements into his film scores, notably the use of women's and children's choirs (Scrooged, Nightbreed, Edward Scissorhands, Batman Returns, Sleepy Hollow, Alice in Wonderland, The Grinch), and solo voice or vocal effects (Beetlejuice, Mars Attacks!, Men in Black II, Flubber, Nacho Libre, Iris, Dark Shadows, The Girl on the Train). Evoking the "O Fortuna" from Carl Orff's Carmina Burana, he set made-up, Latin-sounding text for SATB choir in standout cue "Descent into Mystery" from Batman.

Elfman also adds his own vocals into compositions in much the same way he mixes his percussion and guitar performances into orchestral arrangements. Prominent use can be heard in the scores for To Die For (sung with director Gus Van Sant, credited to "Little Gus and the Suzettes"), Silver Linings Playbook, and his music for the Hong Kong Disneyland ride Mystic Manor. He provided the singing voice for characters in The Nightmare Before Christmas and Corpse Bride in addition to composing the scores and songs, and can be heard singing the "Day-O" call in the style of Harry Belafonte's "Banana Boat Song" in the first bars of the Beetlejuice main title.

For Tim Burton's Charlie and the Chocolate Factory, Elfman set Roald Dahl's text for the Oompa-Loompa characters as four stylistically distinct songs: the Bollywood-influenced "Augustus Gloop", the funk-infused "Violet Beauregarde", the psychedelic pop stylings of "Veruca Salt" and the baroque rock of "Mike Teavee". For all songs in the film, Elfman sang, manipulated and mixed several layers of his vocals to create the singing voices and harmonies of the Oompa Loompas, and incorporated his vocals into non-song score tracks that featured the characters, including "Loompa Land", "Chocolate River", "The Boat Arrives" and "The River Cruise".

=== Lyrics ===
Elfman typically writes the lyrics to songs he has composed for movies. He employs song structures from Tin Pan Alley and early musical theatre composers (32-bar form), and pop and rock of the 1950s and 1960s (verse-chorus). As his songs serve to advance the plot and develop characters, lyrics reflect storylines and imagery specific to the film and express the inner life of characters.

He wrote the lyrics and music for ten songs featured in the stop-motion musical The Nightmare Before Christmas. Drawing from Tim Burton's parody poem of A Visit from St. Nicholas and concept drawings, Elfman wrote each song in consultation with Burton before the film even had a script. These include the full-cast songs "This Is Halloween", "Town Meeting Song" and "Making Christmas"; four songs for the main character Jack Skellington, "Jack's Lament", "What's This?", "Jack's Obsession" and "Poor Jack", all sung by Elfman; and the other character songs "Kidnap the Sandy Claws", "Oogie Boogie's Song" and "Sally's Song". An eleventh song, "Finale/Reprise", reworks lyrics from the songs "This Is Halloween", "What's This?" and "Sally's Song" for the film's ending. Though uncredited, Burton contributed some lyrics to Nightmare, including the line "Perhaps it's the head that I found in the lake" in "Town Meeting Song".

Elfman composed five songs for Burton's Corpse Bride: "According to Plan", with lyrics co-written by screenwriter John August; "Remains of the Day" (which he sung as the character Bonejangles) and "Tears to Shed", both with additional lyrics by August; and "The Wedding Song", credited solely to Elfman. The song "Erased" was not used in the final film.

He wrote the lyrics to "Lullaby" from Charlotte's Web, the rock track "The Little Things" from Wanted which he also sang in English and Russian, and "Alice's Theme" from Alice in Wonderland. Elfman co-wrote the lyrics to "Twice the Love" from Big Fish and the "Wonka's Welcome Song" for Charlie and the Chocolate Factory with John August.

Elfman wrote the lyrics to all of Oingo Boingo's original songs 1979–1994 and has made residuals on the titular two-word opening phrase sung in his The Simpsons theme since the series first aired in 1989.

== Personal life ==
As a teenager, Elfman dated his classmate Kim Gordon, who would later become one of the members of the rock band Sonic Youth. After returning from France and Africa, he met and married Geri Eisenmenger. He adopted Eisenmenger's daughter from a previous relationship. They had a daughter together in 1984. Elfman and Eisenmenger eventually divorced.

In 1998, Elfman scored the movie, A Simple Plan, where he met the leading actress, Bridget Fonda. They began dating and on November 29, 2003, Elfman and Fonda were married. They had a son in 2005. Elfman is the uncle of actor Bodhi Elfman, who is married to actress Jenna Elfman.

Elfman has been an atheist since the age of 11 or 12. In an interview with the New York Post, he referred to himself as a "cynic-ologist".

Describing his politics during the 1980s, Elfman said, "I'm not a doomist. My attitude is always to be critical of what's around you, but not ever to forget how lucky we are. I've traveled around the world. I left thinking I was a revolutionary. I came back real right-wing patriotic. Since then, I've kind of mellowed in between." Several of his songs written for Oingo Boingo during this period satirized social politics, although Elfman stated his message was to "question, resist, challenge" and that his songs were not aligned to any one political agenda.

In 2008, Elfman expressed support for Barack Obama. For the 2020 Democratic National Convention, he scored the biographical video played ahead of Joe Biden's acceptance of the presidential nomination in the 2020 United States elections. In a series of posts on his Instagram page discussing the video, Elfman criticized Donald Trump, Richard Nixon, and the electoral college, and linked to several voter resources.

During his 18 years with Oingo Boingo, Elfman developed significant hearing damage as a result of the continuous exposure to the high noise levels involved in performing in a rock band. Afraid of worsening his condition, he decided to leave the band, saying that he would never return to that kind of performance. His impairment was so bad that he could not "even sit in a loud restaurant or bar anymore." However, he found performing in front of orchestras more tolerable, and returned several times to reprise his live performance of Jack Skellington.

=== Sexual harassment allegations ===
Composer Nomi Abadi has alleged that Elfman had been involved in multiple instances of sexual harassment and misconduct with her that took place from 2015 to 2016. Elfman has denied these claims. The allegations reportedly resulted in Elfman and Abadi agreeing to a non-public settlement and nondisclosure agreement, wherein Elfman would have paid Abadi a total of $830,000 over time. In 2024, Abadi sued Elfman for defamation for statements he made to Rolling Stone. Elfman's bid to dismiss the suit was denied in 2024.

== In popular culture ==
Elfman's composition "Clown Dream" from Pee-wee's Big Adventure is used in the video game Grand Theft Auto V and has often been used as the opening music for Primus concerts.

In the 2007 sixth season Star Wars parody "Blue Harvest", Family Guy lampooned Elfman's orchestral style. A scene shows Elfman replacing an incinerated John Williams to conduct a full orchestra playing the score, only to be decapitated by a lightsaber after conducting a few bars of oom-pah music.

Episode five of the 14th season of South Park in 2010 criticized Tim Burton for using the "same" music in all his films, referring to Elfman's scores.

In October 2016, Elfman produced a video clip for Funny or Die with original "horror" music composed to footage of Donald Trump pacing around Hillary Clinton at the second United States presidential election debates, 2016.

In 2019, selections from Elfman's Midnight Run score were used in the third season of Netflix's Stranger Things, including "Stairway Chase" in episodes 5 and 6, and "Wild Ride" and "Package Deal" in episode 6.

Christina Aguilera revealed that Elfman's music inspired her Las Vegas concert residency The Xperience.

== Awards and nominations ==
Danny Elfman awards and nominations
Award	Wins	Nominations
Academy Awards	0	4
Annie Awards	0	1
BMI Film & Television Awards	24	24
British Academy Film Awards	0	2
Broadcast Film Critics Association Awards	0	2
Chicago Film Critics Association Awards	0	4
Emmy Awards	3	5
Golden Globe Awards	0	2
Grammy Awards	1	11
Phoenix Film Critics Society Awards	0	1
Satellite Awards	1	6
Saturn Awards	7	16
Sierra Awards	1	2
World Soundtrack Awards	0	2
Totals
Awards won	39	
Nominations	105	

=== American Film Institute ===
Elfman's scores for Batman and Edward Scissorhands were nominated for AFI's 100 Years of Film Scores.

== Discography ==
Including commercial recordings of his film scores and the Oingo Boingo discography, Elfman has produced over 100 albums as of 2019.

== See also ==
- Music of the Marvel Cinematic Universe
- Batman music
