= Steve Bartek =

American musician (born 1952)

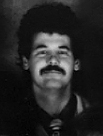
- Bartek in 1987

Background information
- Born: January 30, 1952 (age 74)
- Origin: Garfield Heights, Ohio, U.S.
- Genres: Rock; classical; film scores
- Occupations: Orchestrator; composer; conductor; guitarist
- Instruments: Guitar; Flute; Accordion; Percussion
- Years active: 1967–present

Steve Bartek (born January 30, 1952) is an American guitarist, film composer, conductor and orchestrator. He is best known as lead guitarist in the band Oingo Boingo and for his orchestration work with composer Danny Elfman. In addition, he is a current member of the psychedelic rock band Strawberry Alarm Clock.

== Career ==
=== Early career ===
Bartek's career started while at William Howard Taft High School in Woodland Hills, California, writing songs and playing flute with the psychedelic rock band Strawberry Alarm Clock. In 1974, he graduated from UCLA with a degree in Composition.

After college, he worked at the Baked Potato with Leon Gaer under the leadership of Don Randi until joining the theatrical ensemble The Mystic Knights of the Oingo Boingo in 1975, where he met his collaborator Danny Elfman.

Between 1979 and 1995, Bartek was the lead guitarist in new wave band Oingo Boingo with Elfman. Bartek also orchestrated the horn arrangements for the band and co-produced many of their albums.

=== Film and television ===
Bartek has composed music for television series including The Tick, Tales from the Crypt, Nightmare Ned and Steven Spielberg's Amazing Stories, and movies including An Extremely Goofy Movie, Romy and Michele's High School Reunion, Romy and Michele: In the Beginning, Snow Day, Novocaine, the 1998 remake of Psycho and The Art of Travel. In 1992 he was nominated for a Saturn Award for his soundtrack to Guilty as Charged. In 2005, together with Danny Elfman and Stewart Copeland, he was awarded an BMI Film & TV Award for his work on Desperate Housewives.

As an orchestrator, Bartek has worked on over 50 productions with Danny Elfman as of 2007, including most Tim Burton productions, Mission: Impossible, Good Will Hunting, Spider-Man and Milk, and has done orchestration work with composers Jon Brion and Stephen Trask.

Bartek provided the soundtrack for Donovan Cook's indie film Rideshare: The Movie, alongside former Oingo Boingo member Johnny "Vatos" Hernandez.

In 2015 Steve performed the theme to Harvey Beaks.

=== Other work ===
Steve Bartek did horn arrangements for Avenged Sevenfold's song "A Little Piece of Heaven" as well as for John Hiatt's "Little Head". He produced Raya Yarbrough's eponymous album and arranged strings for the song "Early Autumn". He also did a string arrangement for Ricky Martin's "Vuelve".

Bartek played the acoustic guitar on the Bangles cover of "A Hazy Shade of Winter" on the Rick Rubin arranged soundtrack for the 1987 film "Less Than Zero".

Bartek played guitar for the TV series Battlestar Galactica, Trauma and Walking Dead.

Bartek also contributed music to both the ride queue and exit of Disneyland's short-lived Rocket Rods attraction in 1998, including a synthesizer arrangement of Steppenwolf's "Born to Be Wild" and "World of Creativity (Magic Highways of Tomorrow)", the latter being a radical re-arrangement of "Detroit", a song originally written and composed by the Sherman Brothers for the 1967 Disney film, The Happiest Millionaire.

Bartek, in 2012, worked with Ego Plum in arranging a live tribute show held at the Walt Disney Concert Hall's REDCAT entitled "Machine Man: The Musical Mayhem of Raymond Scott".

Bartek played guitar on Gerald Casale's 2021 single, "I'm Gonna Pay U Back".

Since 2006, Bartek has played with other former members of Oingo Boingo in Oingo Boingo Former Members, formerly known as Oingo Boingo Dance Party.

== Select filmography ==
- 1988 Midnight Run
- 1989 Communion
- 1991 Guilty as Charged
- 1991 Past Midnight
- 1994 Cabin Boy
- 1995 National Lampoon's Senior Trip
- 1995 Coldblooded
- 1997 Romy and Michele's High School Reunion
- 1998 Meet the Deedles
- 1998 Psycho
- 2000 Snow Day
- 2000 An Extremely Goofy Movie
- 2000 The Crew
- 2001 Get Over It
- 2001 Novocaine
- 2003 Carolina
- 2007 The Simpsons Movie
- 2008 Art Of Travel
- 2011 Rideshare
