= Anthology (Oingo Boingo album) =

Compilation album by Oingo Boingo
- Released: November 2, 1999
- Genres: New wave; ska; alternative rock
- Length: 149:12
- Label: Hip-O Records
- Producers: Bob Garcia, Laura Engel

Oingo Boingo chronology
Farewell (1996)	Anthology (1999)	The Best of Oingo Boingo: 20th Century Masters The Millennium Collection (2002)

Professional ratings
Review scores
Source	Rating
AllMusic	4/5 stars

Anthology is the third compilation album of songs by American new wave band Oingo Boingo, released in 1999 by Hip-O Records. The two-disc set is the band's first full career-spanning retrospective, compiling material from all of the band's albums on I.R.S. Records, A&M Records, MCA Records and Giant Records.

== Track listing ==
All songs written and composed by Danny Elfman.

=== Disc one ===
No.	Title	Original release	Length
1.	"Intro - Tender Lumplings (Live)"	Farewell (1996)	0:47
2.	"Ain't This the Life"	Demo EP / Oingo Boingo EP (10" Version)	3:39
3.	"Nasty Habits"	Only a Lad (1981)	4:08
4.	"On the Outside"	Only a Lad (1981)	3:52
5.	"Only a Lad"	Only a Lad (1981)	3:58
6.	"Little Girls"	Only a Lad (1981)	3:36
7.	"Grey Matter"	Nothing to Fear (1982)	5:52
8.	"Wild Sex (in the Working Class)"	Nothing to Fear (1982)	4:08
9.	"Private Life"	Nothing to Fear (1982)	3:17
10.	"No Spill Blood"	Good for Your Soul (1983)	3:42
11.	"Nothing Bad Ever Happens"	Good for Your Soul (1983)	3:44
12.	"Sweat"	Good for Your Soul (1983)	4:49
13.	"Who Do You Want to Be"	Good for Your Soul (1983)	3:33
14.	"Gratitude" (Danny Elfman)	So-Lo (1984)	5:15
15.	"It Only Makes Me Laugh" (Danny Elfman)	So-Lo (1984)	4:06
16.	"Everybody Needs" (Danny Elfman)	So-Lo (1984)	3:52
17.	"Dead Man's Party"	Dead Man's Party (1985)	6:20
18.	"Weird Science"	Dead Man's Party (1985)	6:12

=== Disc two ===
No.	Title	Original release	Length
1.	"Just Another Day"	Dead Man's Party (1985)	5:14
2.	"Stay"	Dead Man's Party (1985)	3:37
3.	"Not My Slave"	BOI-NGO (1987)	4:42
4.	"Where Do All My Friends Go"	BOI-NGO (1987)	4:29
5.	"Mama"	Boingo Alive (1988)	4:49
6.	"Cinderella Undercover"	Boingo Alive (1988)	4:38
7.	"Flesh 'N' Blood"	Dark at the End of the Tunnel (1990)	4:17
8.	"When the Lights Go Out"	Dark at the End of the Tunnel (1990)	4:10
9.	"Out of Control"	Dark at the End of the Tunnel (1990)	4:09
10.	"Insanity (Medium Version)"	"Insanity" CD single (1994). Original version from Boingo (1994).	4:57
11.	"Mary"	Boingo (1994)	6:26
12.	"We Close Our Eyes (Live)"	Farewell (1996)	4:42
13.	"Whole Day Off (Live)"	Farewell (1996)	4:37
14.	"Piggies (Live)"	Farewell (1996)	6:54
15.	"Insects (Live)"	Farewell (1996)	3:26
16.	"Goodbye, Goodbye"	Boingo Alive (1988)	3:31

== Personnel ==
- Danny Elfman – lead vocals, rhythm guitars
- Steve Bartek – lead guitars, background vocals
- Johnny "Vatos" Hernandez – drums, percussion
- Leon Schneiderman – baritone and alto saxophones
- Sam "Sluggo" Phipps – tenor and soprano saxophones
- Dale Turner – trumpet, trombones
- Richard Gibbs – keyboards (disc 1: tracks 1–16)
- Kerry Hatch – bass (disc 1: tracks 1–16)
- John Avila – bass, background vocals (disc 1: tracks 17–18, disc 2: tracks 1–16)
- Michael Bacich – keyboards (disc 1: tracks 17–18, disc 2: tracks 1–4)
- Carl Graves – keyboards (disc 2: tracks 5–9, 16)
- Warren Fitzgerald – guitars, background vocals (disc 2: tracks 10–15)
- Marc Mann – keyboards, samples (disc 2: tracks 10–15)
- Doug Lacy – accordion (disc 2: tracks 10–15)
