= Forbidden Zone (soundtrack) =

Soundtrack album by The Mystic Knights of the Oingo Boingo
- Released: 1983
- Recorded: November 1978/October 1979
- Genre: Film score; new wave
- Label: Varèse Sarabande

Danny Elfman soundtracks chronology
Forbidden Zone (1983)	Pee-wee's Big Adventure (1985)

Professional ratings
Review scores
Source	Rating
AllMusic	4.5/5 stars

Forbidden Zone (Original Motion Picture Soundtrack) is the soundtrack album to Forbidden Zone, the 1982 cult film directed by Richard Elfman, with music by his brother Danny Elfman and performed by The Mystic Knights of the Oingo Boingo.

The album marked the soundtrack debut of composer Danny Elfman, who was frontman to the Mystic Knights at time of recording.

The soundtrack album is the only public release accredited to The Mystic Knights of the Oingo Boingo, recorded between 1978 and 1979—during which time the band was transitioning into Oingo Boingo. Initial tracks were recorded by the Mystic Knights before their disbanding and completed by members of Oingo Boingo a year later, resulting in the mix of musicians credited on the album. In the liner notes, Danny Elfman writes that "sixty minutes of original music in a dozen different styles needed to be created in and around various older, and often uneven, pre-recorded pieces," and were composed, arranged and recorded in a period of two weeks.

While the original Varèse Sarabande LP version contained 22 tracks, the label reissued the album in 1990 with the tracks "Pico and Sepulveda" and "La Petite Tonkinoise" removed. Two additional tracks, "Some of These Days" and "Bim Bam Boom", were removed for the French release.

== Track listing ==
All music is composed by Danny Elfman and the Mystic Knights of the Oingo Boingo, except where otherwise indicated.

Side one
No.	Title	Writer(s)	Vocals	Length
1.	"Forbidden Zone"		Danny Elfman	2:45
2.	"'Hercules' Family Theme"			1:37
3.	"Some of These Days"	Shelton Brooks	Cab Calloway, Kipper Kids	2:50
4.	"Journey Through the Intestines"			0:55
5.	"Squeezit's Vision of His 'Sister'"			0:30
6.	"Queen's Revenge"		Danny Elfman, Marie-Pascale Elfman, Susan Tyrrell	2:40
7.	"Pico and Sepulveda"	Eddie Maxwell / Jule Styne	Boulevard Stompers	2:28
8.	"Factory"			0:58
9.	"Love Theme - Squeezit and the Chickens"			0:42
10.	"Flash and Gramps"			0:56
11.	"Squeezit the Moocher (Minnie the Moocher)"	Cab Calloway / Irving Mills (Lyrics by D. Elfman)	Danny Elfman, Toshiro Boloney	4:48

Side two
No.	Title	Writer(s)	Vocals	Length
1.	"Alphabet Song"		Cast	1:58
2.	"La Petite Tonkinoise"	Henri Christiné / Vincent Scotto	Josephine Baker	2:11
3.	"Cell 63"			1:20
4.	"Witch's Egg"	George Mishalsky / Susan Tyrrell	Susan Tyrrell	2:22
5.	"Yiddishe Charleston"	Billy Rose / Fred Fischer	R. Yossele Elfman, Susan Tyrrell	1:33
6.	"Bim Bam Boom"	Nino Morales / Johnny Comacho	Miguelito Valdés, Kipper Kids	1:53
7.	"Chamber Music"			1:58
8.	"Pleure"	Jérôme Savary	Marie-Pascale Elfman	0:37
9.	"Battle of the Queens"			3:04
10.	"Love Theme - King and Queen"			1:08
11.	"Finale"			3:20

== Credits ==
Principal musicians are:

- Danny Elfman (Lead Vocals)
- Steve Bartek (Guitar)
- Kerry Hatch (Bass)
- John Hernandez (Drums, Percussion)
- Sam Phipps (Reeds, Flute)
- Leon Schneiderman (Reeds, Flute)
- Dale Turner (Trumpet)
- Stuart Elster (Piano)
- Brad Kay (Piano)
- Dan Schmidt (Synthesizer)
- Carol Emmanuel (Harp)
