= Pee-wee's Big Adventure (soundtrack) =

1988 film soundtrack album

Film score by Danny Elfman
- Released: October 31, 1988 (along with Back to School); May 25, 2010 (as part of The Danny Elfman & Tim Burton 25th Anniversary Music Box)
- Recorded: June 27–28, 1985
- Studios: CBS, London
- Genre: Film score
- Length: 20:36 / 48:39
- Labels: Varèse Sarabande; Warner Bros.
- Producer: Danny Elfman

Danny Elfman chronology
Forbidden Zone (1982)	Pee-wee's Big Adventure (1988)	Back to School (1986)

The soundtrack for the 1985 adventure comedy film Pee-wee's Big Adventure features an original score composed by Danny Elfman. The film is the feature directorial debut of Tim Burton and stars Paul Reubens as Pee-wee Herman, along with Elizabeth Daily, Mark Holton, Diane Salinger and Judd Omen. This was the first collaboration between Elfman and Burton, who would work together on other successive films. The score was recorded at CBS Studios in London in June 1985.

Initially, Varèse Sarabande issued re-recorded excerpts from the score on October 31, 1988, as part of a compilation album that also contained the score for Elfman's Back to School (1986). The complete original score, including re-recordings and outtakes, was released as part of The Danny Elfman & Tim Burton 25th Anniversary Music Box on May 25, 2010.

== Development ==
Reubens initially approached Devo frontman Mark Mothersbaugh to score the film, but Mothersbaugh was unavailable, due to a scheduling conflict. However, he would later compose the theme song and other episodic music for Reubens' television series Pee-wee's Playhouse.

Burton then recruited Danny Elfman, the lead singer/songwriter of Oingo Boingo, to score Pee-wee's Big Adventure, despite the fact that his only prior scoring experience was for his brother Richard Elfman's cult film Forbidden Zone (1982). Reubens had been a fan of Forbidden Zone and was determined to enlist Danny for a project someday. Burton was familiar with Elfman's work with Oingo Boingo and, upon meeting, the two felt an immediate kinship. Elfman was initially hesitant to take on the project, given his lack of scoring experience, but had written the main title theme by the time that he signed on. Elfman also had no experience playing piano and had difficulty demonstrating some of his scoring ideas for Burton. He approached the project with a cavalier attitude, thinking it would be "good experience" but anticipating that Warner Bros. would ultimately reject his work.

I remember seeing the bicycle race at the beginning of the movie. My sense of it was that it didn't feel like a normal American comedy. It almost felt like a European comedy. It reminded me of something I might see in France or England, like Mr. Bean or Mr. Hulot's Holiday, so I approached it as if it was a kind of weird Italian film.

— Danny Elfman; IndieWire, August 6, 2025

Elfman's original score draws inspiration from film composers Nino Rota and Bernard Herrmann. (Note: "As for the Herrmann touch, Elfman was able to draw from that reservoir in some of the film's more inspired dream sequences. 'There was some strange and wonderful music of Herrmann's that influenced me, in particular, Jason and the Argonauts, The Seventh Voyage of Sinbad, and Mysterious Island.'") "The Breakfast Machine" was inspired by Rota's score for The Clowns (1970), while Elfman's use of staccato strings, particularly when Pee-wee first discovers his bike has been stolen, echoes Herrmann's score for Psycho (1960). The Dissolve writer Mike D'Angelo observed that Elfman also seemed to be emulating the works of Warner Bros. cartoon composer Carl W. Stalling, noting, "At that point, Burton had spent his entire career as an animator, and Pee-wee’s Big Adventure is a live-action film with a distinctly animated sensibility. In keeping with that approach, Elfman often has the music respond directly to whatever's happening onscreen, just as the music in a cartoon would." Burton later said, "Danny and I talked about trying to get into that kind of scenario, without being overly cartoony. With cartoons, it's almost like silent movie music, where the music tells the story of what you're seeing. It's a cartoon technique, but we didn't try to overdo it."

The film also features "Burn in Hell" by Twisted Sister and "Tequila" by the Champs.

== Releases ==
In 1988, record label Varèse Sarabande released an album featuring 20 minutes of re-recorded cues from Pee-wee's Big Adventure, combined with cues from another Elfman-scored film, Back to School (1986). While the scores for both films were recorded in Hollywood, the album was recorded in London and performed by the National Philharmonic Orchestra, conducted by John Coleman.

In 2010, both the original score sessions and re-recordings were released by Warner Bros. Records as part of The Danny Elfman & Tim Burton 25th Anniversary Music Box. The album also included additional cues, alternate versions and a restored "Studio Chase" sequence.

== Reception ==
D'Angelo found Elfman's contribution to the film "incalculable", noting its inspiration from Rota's and Hermann's work and cartoon music. D'Angelo said, "Watching the movie this way, it becomes clear that there's scarcely a moment in it that's not heightened, and to a large extent defined, by Elfman's music. For all its terrific gags and inspired images, Pee-wee's Big Adventure would most likely resemble sketch comedy without that score working to create a unifying flavor. Elfman gives the film its goofy grandeur." William Thomas of Empire considered it to be a "witty" score.

Jonathan Broxton of Movie Music UK considered it as "one of the great film music debut scores, which introduced the world to the iconic soundtrack sound of Danny Elfman, and which should be an integral part of any serious soundtrack collection for that reason alone". Filmtracks reviewed, "On the whole, it's important to remember that Pee-wee's Big Adventure is a ridiculous comedy movie and thus received Elfman's version of the Warner Brothers cartoon sound. For an inexperienced composer to crank out this music is amazing, but that doesn't necessarily make it palatable for many collectors of Elfman's later music of any genre."

== Track listing ==
Pee-wee's Big Adventure / Back to School
No.	Title	Length
1.	"Overture/The Big Race"	3:07
2.	"Breakfast Machine"	2:36
3.	"Park Ride"	1:14
4.	"Stolen Bike"	1:44
5.	"Hitchhike"	0:56
6.	"Dinosaur Dream"	0:48
7.	"Simone's Theme"	1:35
8.	"Clown Dream"	1:58
9.	"Studio Chase"	1:24
10.	"The Drive-In"	2:02
11.	"Finale"	3:12
Total length:		20:36

The Danny Elfman & Tim Burton 25th Anniversary Box – Pee-wee's Big Adventure (Disc 1)
No.	Title	Length
1.	"Main Title/Bike Race"	2:54
2.	"The Breakfast Machine"	2:40
3.	"The Bike"	1:42
4.	"The Park Ride"	1:19
5.	"The Mall"	1:12
6.	"Music Shop And Beyond"	1:05
7.	"Stolen Bike/Lonely Walk"	1:42
8.	"Francis' House"	0:34
9.	"The Bath"	1:32
10.	"The Basement"	2:14
11.	"Hitch Hike"	0:57
12.	"Edsel Over the Edge"	1:21
13.	"Simone's Theme"	1:37
14.	"Dinosaur Dream"	0:49
15.	"Andy Chase"	0:51
16.	"Alamo"	0:19
17.	"Bus Station/Simone"	1:04
18.	"Clown Dream"	2:00
19.	"Studio Chase"	1:25
20.	"Pet Shop"	2:11
21.	"The Drive-In"	2:04
22.	"Finale"	3:07
23.	"Large Marge"	0:52
24.	"The Fork"	0:27
25.	"Rain/Fortune"	1:39
26.	"Andy Chase 2"	0:26
27.	"Cowboy Pee-wee"	0:33
28.	"Andy & the Bull"	0:26
29.	"Stolen Bike/Lonely Walk" (Film Version)	1:40
30.	"Hitch Hike" (Film Version)	0:57
31.	"Simone" (Film Version)	2:09
32.	"Dino Dreams" (Film Version)	0:47
33.	"Studio Chase" (Film Version)	3:58
Total length:		48:39

== Bibliography ==
- Burton, Tim (2006). Salisbury, Mark (ed.). Burton on Burton. Faber & Faber. ISBN 978-0571229260.
