= Oingo Boingo (disambiguation) =

Oingo Boingo was an American new wave band.

Oingo Boingo may also refer to:

- Oingo Boingo (EP), the second official release from the group with the same name
- Oingo and Boingo, fictional characters from the Japanese manga series JoJo's Bizarre Adventure
