= You're My Everything =

You're My Everything may refer to:

== Albums ==
- You're My Everything, by Gianni Basso
- You're My Everything, by Nat King Cole
- You're My Everything, by Rich Perry
- You're My Everything, by Ghana's KICC Choir with Helen Yawson

== Songs ==
- "You're My Everything" (1931 song), by Harry Warren, Mort Dixon and Joe Young
- "You're My Everything" (Anita Baker song), 2004
- "You're My Everything" (Lee Garrett song), 1976
- "You're My Everything" (The Temptations song), 1967
- "You Are My Everything" by Surface, 1989
- "You're My Everything", by Alvin Stardust
- "You're My Everything", by Anny Schilder
- "You're My Everything", by Bobby Powell
- "You're My Everything", by Derrick Harriott
- "You're My Everything", by George Hughley
- "You're My Everything", by Rance Allen
- "You're My Everything", by René Froger
- "You're My Everything", by Santa Esmeralda
- "You're My Everything", by Slim Smith
- "You're My Everything", by The Vanguards
- "(You Are) My Everything", by Ariana Grande from My Everything
- "You Are My Everything", by Janelle Monáe from The Audition

== Other ==
- You're My Everything (film), 1949 film directed by Walter Lang starring Dan Dailey and Anne Baxter

== See also ==
- "You're the First, the Last, My Everything", song by Barry White
