= Gokor =

Gokor may refer to:

- Gokor Chivichyan
- Gokor from Richard Elfman's Streets of Rage (1994)
