= Lee Garrett =

American singer-songwriter (born 1943)

- Born: June 30, 1943 (age 83); Mississippi, U.S.
- Genres: Soul; R&B
- Occupations: Radio DJ; singer; songwriter
- Years active: 1960s–present
- Labels: American First Record Corporation; Chrysalis Records; Harthon; Van Dyk; World Artists

Lee Garrett (born June 30, 1943) is an American rhythm and blues singer-songwriter, most famous for co-writing the classic song "Signed, Sealed, Delivered I'm Yours". He recorded several solo singles during the 1960s, one of which was "I Can't Break the Habit". He had a hit in 1976 with "You're My Everything". Artists who have covered his compositions include Taka Boom, Carl Graves, Peter Frampton, Denny McCaffrey, Eddie Money, Jackie Moore, Marlena Shaw, The Spinners, Frankie Valli and many more.

Garrett has also worked as a radio show host and program director.

== Background ==
Garrett is a Mississippi born singer, composer and radio D.J., and a graduate of the Missouri School for the Blind.

In addition to his part in composing "Signed, Sealed, Delivered I'm Yours", he wrote several songs with Stevie Wonder, including the Jermaine Jackson song "Let's Get Serious", and for The Spinners, "It's a Shame". Garrett and Wonder would eventually be involved in a legal battle over a song.

Garrett worked in radio during the 1960s and 1970s. In his days working in Philadelphia and Detroit, he was known as "The Rockin' Mr. G".

In 1976, his solo track "You're My Everything" reached number 15 in the UK Singles Chart. Without any further chart presence, he became a one-hit wonder.

Following the legal dispute relating to the song, "I Just Called to Say I Love You", Garrett and Wonder have mended their relationship over the years. During his 2007 tour, during a performance on August 30, Wonder paid tribute to Garrett by singing a medley of songs they co-created, and also introduced Garrett to the audience by acknowledging his presence at the show, and thanking him for years of friendship and support.

Garrett resides in the Portland, Oregon, area (in Beaverton, a city just west of Portland) and continues to perform throughout the United States. As of 2004, he was the featured vocalist with a 1950s style rock and roll style group called the Boomer Band. He has also worked with saxophonist and Oregon Music Hall of Fame member, Patrick Lamb. They have composed songs together and in a 2013 interview with the Portland Tribune by Rob Cullivan, lamb recalled how he would be working on a groove and a chord change and a concept, with ten minutes later, Garrett would be singing a hook. Lamb called him pure realness and said that he was the bomb.

== Career ==
=== 1960s ===
Garrett recorded the song "Linda Sue" bw "Tell the World" which was released on the Van Dyk label (cat# 1606) in November 1964. In 1965, his single "I Need Somebody" was released on the World Artists label (cat# 1061). It was given a Hot 100 prediction by Billboard in the August 21 issue. As recorded by Record World in the August 28, 1965 issue, his record had a "Busted" status at WSID in Baltimore. It was also on the "New for Play" list at WAMO in Pittsburgh.

In early 1967, Garrett was still working at Radio WJMO in Cleveland. He was put in the 10 to midnight slot by George Wilson. Garrett's show came on after Georgie Woods' show. Also that year, Garrett had a single "I can't break the habit" released on the Harthon label, cat no. 137. The song would later find popularity on the Northern Soul scene. By August 1967, Garrett who had the "9 to Midnight" show at Philadelphia's WHAT r&b station had filled position of musical director. He was also continuing with his regular show. Years later, Garrett recalled when he was working as a DJ in Detroit, he would play Johnny Cash's "A Boy Named Sue" and Ray Stevens', "Gitarzan", reasoning that the songs being so popular, there must have been black people buying them as well.

=== 1970s ===
It was reported in the December 9, 1972, issue of Billboard that Garrett having worked as an all night D.J. at WHAT-AM in Philadelphia and WLOK-AM in Memphis was seeking more work in radio. That same year, the song "It's a Shame" that Garrett and Syreeta Wright had a hand in composing was named a winner in the 1972 BMI Rhythm & Blues achievement awards.

It was reported by Record World in the April 26, 1975 issue that Island Music Ltd. executives, Lionel Conway and Allan Rider had announced the exclusive signing of writers Garrett and Robert Taylor to the Island Music Ltd.. Garrett and Taylor had decided to work as a team, combining their talents. Taylor had worked with Barry White. This acquisition of Garrett and Taylor represented the label's first US signing.

Candy Tusken who had the regular Record Industry Notes column in Radio & Records, wrote in the March 12, 1976 issue that Garrett's debut album, Heat for the Feets and his single "You're My Everything" would be available that month.

Hit song

According to the June 5, 1976, article in Record Mirror, 'The only colour I see is Music' Garrett came to Chrysalis because of a rumor that the label's new US office were scouting for Black American talent. Garrett was the label's first US signing.

In May, 1976, Garrett had his hit with "You're My Everything". In the US, it peaked at no. 58 in the HOT 100 chart. Across the sea in the UK, it spent seven weeks in the UK singles chart, peaking at no. 15. It also peaked at no. 9 on the Record Mirror UK Soul Top 20 chart, and no. 5 on the Record Mirror UK Disco Top 20 chart.

Garrett performed "You're My Everything" on Top of the Pops in an episode which was broadcast on May 13 that year. He also made another appearance on the show on June 10. The song also appears on the Top Of The Pops 1976 compilation released on EMI Gold in 2007.

Garrett, Lou Rawls, Mike Love and Donna Summer etc. were pictured in a small article, Basket Cases or Or is it Wicker's World in the October 16, 1976 issue of Record Mirror. It showed musicians sitting in peacock basket chairs. The caption under Garrett's picture read, ". . . now Garret really gets into the part - he's got the throne, now what about the crown . . .?"

Album

His hit appeared on his album Heat for the Feets which also included "It's Better than Walking Out", "Heart Be Still", "You're My Everything", "How Can I Be a Man", "Broken Down D.J.", "Sad, Sad Story", "Stop that Wrong", " Love Enough For Two" and "Don't Let it Get You Down". Musicians who played on the album included Harvey Mason, Lee Ritenour, June Millington, Tom Scott and Dave Grusin. Also around that time, Marlena Shaw had a minor hit with one of the songs, "Better than Walking Out", which Garrett had co-composed with Robert Taylor. "Heart Be Still" would be covered by artists such as Carl Graves, Jackie Moore and Frankie Valli.

Details
No.	Track	Composer	Time	Notes
A1	"Better than Walkin' Out"	Lee Garrett and Robert Taylor	4:42	
A2	"Heart Be Still"	Lee Garrett and Robert Taylor	4:58	
A3	"You're My Everything"	Lee Garrett and Robert Taylor	3:24	
A4	"How Can I Be A Man"	Lee Garrett and Robert Taylor	7:20	
B1	"Broken Down D.J."	Lee Garrett/Tom Sellers	3:42	
B2	"Sad, Sad Story"	Lee Garrett/Robert Taylor	5:14	
B3	"Stop That Wrong"	Lee Garrett	5:34	
B4	"Love Enough For Two"	Lee Garrett/Robert Taylor	3:30	
B5	"Don't Let It Get You Down"	Lee Garrett/Robert Taylor	4:13	

Further activities

By May 22, 1976, the song, "How Can I Be a Man" had been issued on Chrysalis PRO 628 in a 12" format. Vince Aletti in his Disco File column of Record World called a must and incredibly strong.

=== 1980s to 1990s ===
In February, 1981, Garrett's single "See the Love on Your Face" backed with "Searching" was out on American First AFRC-1492. It was given a positive review with the review calling Garrett a "a first-rate R&B crooner" and the song "Top-flight B/C fare". Garrett's record was added to the playlist on WEDR in Miami, Florida as recorded by Radio & Records in the February 20, 1981 issue.

In 1985, Garrett and Lloyd Chiate took Legal action against Stevie Wonder over the song "I Just Called to Say I Love You" claiming that Wonder stole the song from them. With attorney Jack Whitley representing Garrett, the claim was that Garrett and Chiate wrote the song in 1978 when staying with Wonder in a Hollywood hotel. Wonder heard the rehearsals and was give a demo on tape. The song Garrett and Chiate wrote was I "Just Called To Say". It was registered with BMI in 1979. On Garrett and Chiate's song, it had the chorus "I just called to say I love you, I just called to say I think you're fine". Wonder's refrain had a quicker tempo and said, "I just called to say I love you, I just called to say how much I care". According to Jack Whitley, the chords were the same, and both songs were in four-four time. But Wonder's melody line was different. A 10 million dollar lawsuit was filed. In February 1990, the findings were in Wonder's favor with Garrett at some stage having come over to Wonder's side, leaving Chiate to pursue the matter.

=== Later years ===
Garrett was performing with The Boomer Band who had played Great Hall" New Year's Eve 2003 at the Quinault Beach Resort & Casino in Washington state to over 900 guests. By 2004, with the Boomettes handling chorus behind him, Garrett was officially the feature vocalist with the Band which had been going since 1987.

In 2007, Garrett formed a song writing partnership with Mir German of Miriams Well, a rock band based in Portland. German and Garrett had heard about each other from friends in Portland for some time, and were encouraged to meet to consider writing together. The partnership worked and they, along with co-writer Mark Bowden, created an album called Indians And Clowns, released in 2010. Garrett did assist them on three of the album's tracks. Their song catalogue is well over 60 songs to date.}

Garrett toured in 2011 with Miriams Well, sharing the stage for a set of Garrett's Motown hits and more contemporary tunes as well. They appeared together at the Waterfront Blues Festival in Portland in 2011.

In January 2013, The Boomer Band played at the Clambake Jazz Festival.

Denny McCaffrey covered "Better than Walking Out" which appeared on his 2014 album, Come On In.

In the mid 1990s, Garrett recorded a song "Keep Me (from going crazy)" at Studio 29. The backing was made up of an 8-piece brass section and a 5-piece rhythm section. The song was re-mixed and mastered and uploaded in 2026.

For the week of "The Man Behind the Songs", a tribute to Garrett was uploaded to Youtube.

== Discography ==
=== Albums ===
Album(s)Releases USA unless indicated otherwise
Title	Catalogue	Year	Notes #
Heat for the Feets	Chrysalis Records CHR 1109	1976	

=== Singles ===
Singles(selective)Releases USA unless indicated otherwise
Title	Catalogue	Year	Notes #
"Linda Sue" / "Tell the World"	Van Dyk 1606	1964	
"I Need Somebody" / "So Far Away"	World Artists WA 1061	1965	
" I'm So Glad Part 1" / " I'm So Glad Part 2"	Harthon H-141	1966	
"I Can't Break The Habit" / " Baby, Please Don't Go"	Harthon LG-137	1966	
"I Can't Break The Habit" / " Baby, Please Don't Go"	Harthon H-137	1974	
"Heart Be Still" / "Broken Down D.J."	Chrysalis CHS 2101	1976	UK
"You're My Everything" / "Love Enough for Two"	Chrysalis CHS 2112	1976	
"See The Love On Your Face" / "Searching"	American First Record Corporation AFRC-1492	1981	
"Do The Funky 4 Corners" / "Do The Funky 4 Corners" (instrumental)	Rising-Soul RS-104-D		

== See also ==
Songs written by Lee Garrett
