= Pico and Sepulveda =

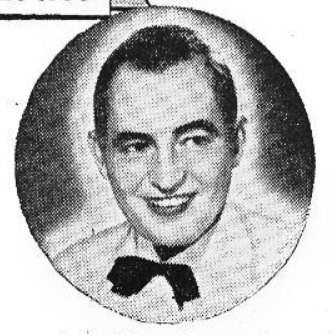

Single by Felix Figueroa & His Orchestra
- Released: 1947
- Genre: Pop
- Length: 2:30
- Songwriters: Eddie Maxwell and Jule Styne

"Pico and Sepulveda" is a 1947 song by Freddy Martin and his orchestra. Composed by Eddie Maxwell (Eddie Cherkose) and Jule Styne (Ambassador Records, 1947 — b/w "She of the Coffee Brown Eyes"), it features a Latin-style beat, and Martin used the alias "Felix Figueroa" when performing and recording the song. It was frequently played on the Dr. Demento radio show in the 1970s, serving as the show's opening theme.

== Background ==
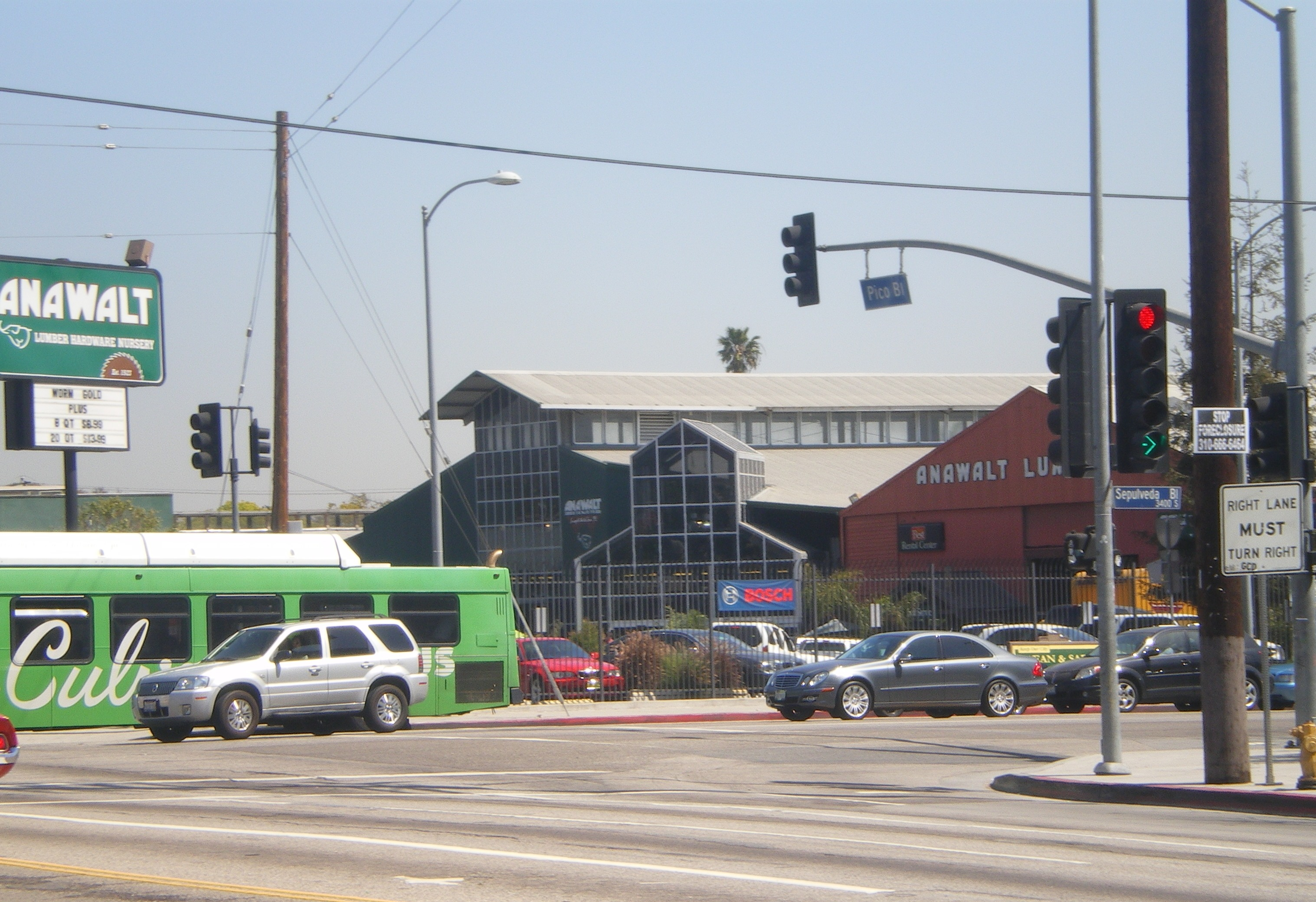
Pico & Sepulveda intersection, 2008

The lyrics are primarily a recitation of the names of various streets in the Los Angeles area: Doheny, Cahuenga, La Brea, La Jolla, Sequoia, Alvarado, Santa Monica, Beverly Drive, and Vine. (Martin's alias, Figueroa, is also a Los Angeles street name.) The intersection of West Pico Boulevard and South Sepulveda Boulevard is in the Rancho Park neighborhood. The singer expresses a desire to "feel alive and settle down in my La Brea Tar Pits, where nobody's dreams come true".

The song was featured in the soundtrack of Richard Elfman's 1980 underground cult film, Forbidden Zone. "Pico and Sepulveda" was covered in 2002 by Lee Presson and the Nails on their album El Bando En Fuego!. Several amateur versions were submitted to and played on the Dr. Demento radio program by such groups as the Roto Rooter Good Time Christmas Band.
