= Just a Matter of Time (Marlena Shaw album) =

Studio album by Marlena Shaw
- Released: 1976
- Recorded: February 1976
- Studio: Mediasound, New York City
- Genre: Jazz
- Label: Blue Note; BN-LA606-G
- Producer: Bert DeCoteaux, Tony Silvester

Marlena Shaw chronology
Who Is This Bitch, Anyway? (1974)	Just a Matter of Time (1976)	Sweet Beginnings (1977)

Just a Matter of Time is an album by American vocalist Marlena Shaw recorded in 1976 and released on the Blue Note label.

== Reception ==
The Allmusic review by Andrew Hamilton awarded the album 2½ stars stating "This is her most commercial Blue Note offering".

Professional ratings
Review scores
Source	Rating
Allmusic	2.5/5 stars

== Track listing ==
1. "It's Better Than Walkin' Out" (Lee Garrett, Robert Taylor) – 4:20
2. "Brass Band" (Bradford Craig) – 3:40
3. "This Time I'll Be Sweeter" (Gwen Guthrie, Patrick Grant) – 4:57
4. "Think About Me" (Gwen Guthrie, Patrick Grant) – 4:30
5. "You and Me" (Carson Whitsett) – 3:57
6. "Love Has Gone Away" (Charles Simmons, Joseph Jefferson) – 4:53
7. "Sing to Me" (Benard Ighner) – 4:00
8. "Take My Body" (Bettye Crutcher) – 4:53
9. "Be for Real" (Frederick Knight) – 4:59
10. "No Hiding Place" (Arranged and adapted by Marlena Shaw) – 2:13

- Recorded at Mediasound Studios in New York City in February 1976.

== Personnel ==
- Marlena Shaw – vocals
- George Butcher, Ricky Williams – keyboards
- Bert De Coteaux – keyboards, arranger
- Jerry Friedman, Hugh McCracken, Jeff Mironov, Lance Quinn – guitar
- Bob Babbitt – electric bass
- Jimmy Young – drums
- Carlos Martin – conga
- David Carey, Teddy Sommer – percussion
