= Bodhi Elfman =

American actor

- Born: Bodhi Pine Saboff; Los Angeles, California, U.S.
- Occupation: Actor
- Years active: 1990–present
- Spouse: Jenna Elfman (m. 1995)
- Children: 2
- Parents: Richard Elfman (father); Rhonda Saboff (mother)
- Relatives: Danny Elfman (uncle); Blossom Elfman (grandmother)

Bodhi Pine Elfman (born Bodhi Pine Saboff) is an American actor. He is the son of filmmaker Richard Elfman and Rhonda Joy Saboff. He is best known for playing the roles of Avram Hader in the Fox television series Touch and for his recurring role in the CBS television series Criminal Minds as Peter "Mr. Scratch" Lewis.

== Early life ==
Bodhi Pine Elfman was born in Los Angeles, California, and raised in the city's Hollywood district. He is the son of actor/director Richard Elfman and Rhonda Joy Saboff, grandson of author Blossom Elfman, and nephew of composer Danny Elfman.

== Career ==
Elfman has had film roles in Mercury Rising, Collateral, Godzilla and Armageddon, and smaller parts in The Mod Squad, Keeping the Faith, and Gone in 60 Seconds.

Elfman starred in the UPN television series Freedom, alongside Holt McCallany, Scarlett Chorvat and Darius McCrary, and in Pirates of Silicon Valley alongside Noah Wyle and Anthony Michael Hall. He appeared in the short-lived ABC television series Hiller and Diller, guest-starred in an episode of Sliders, and was part of the recurring cast of Touch. Elfman also guest-starred in his wife Jenna's television show Dharma & Greg, playing a performance artist who asks Dharma to be a part of his living display gallery.

In 2012, Elfman and his wife Jenna started their podcast, Kicking and Screaming by Jenna and Bodhi Elfman.

== Personal life ==
In February 1991, Elfman met Jennifer Mary Butala (Jenna Elfman) during an audition for a Sprite commercial. Four years later, they were married on February 18, 1995. Bodhi is of Jewish descent, and Jenna was raised Catholic. Jenna became a Scientologist after her husband introduced her to its teachings.

In 2000, Bodhi and Jenna Elfman bought the home owned by Madonna, a 5,000-square-foot (460 m^{2}) 1920s house on a gated two-acre lot in the Hollywood Hills section of Los Angeles. Having paid US$4 million, they later sold the property in April 2004 for US$4.7 million to actress Katey Sagal, of Married... with Children fame.

Their first child, Story Elias, was born in 2007, and their second child, Easton, was born in 2010.

== Filmography ==
=== Film ===
Year	Title	Role	Notes
1992	Sneakers	Centurion S&L Night Guard	
1993	Stepmonster	Photo Cashier	Direct to video film
1994	Shrunken Heads	Booger Martin	
1994	Wes Craven's New Nightmare	TV Studio P.A.	
1995	Ripple	Unknown	Short film
1996	A Very Brady Sequel	Coffee Customer	Credited as Bodhi Pine Elfman
1996	Going Home	Daniel	Short film
1997	The Others	Douglas "Sluggo" Zelov	
1998	Slappy and the Stinkers	"Tag"	Credited as Bodhi Pine Elfman
1998	Mercury Rising	Leo Pedranski	Credited as Bodhi Pine Elfman
1998	Girl	Derek	
1998	Godzilla	Freddie	
1998	Armageddon	Math Guy	
1998	Enemy of the State	NSA Agent Van	Credited as Bodhi Pine Elfman
1999	The Mod Squad	Gilbert, Skinny Freak	Credited as Bodhi Pine Elfman
1999	Rituals and Resolutions	Arno	Short film
2000	Keeping the Faith	Howard, The Casanova	
2000	Gone in 60 Seconds	"Fuzzy" Frizzel	
2000	Almost Famous	Alice's Manager (director's cut only)	Uncredited
2000	Sand	Max	
2001	The Shrink Is In	Charley	
2002	Lost	Hugh	Short film
2002	Hip, Edgy, Sexy, Cool	Unknown	Opening film at the Slamdance Film Festival in Park City, Utah
2004	Collateral	Young Professional Man	
2004	Funky Monkey	Drummond	
2006	Love Hollywood Style	James	
2006	Love Comes to the Executioner	Krist Skolnik	
2008	Struck	Joel (lead)	Short film
2009	Tomorrow	Nick	Short film
2011	Angela Wright	Mr. Taylor	Short film
2012	Desperate Measures	He	Short film
2014	Lennon	Greg Mayburn	Short film
2015	Medicine Men	Baker	
2015	Whitehorse	Kenny	Short film
2016	Sing For Your Supper	Glen	Short film
2018	Electromagnetic	Stanley	
2019	Aliens, Clowns & Geeks	Eddy Pine / Clown Zippy	
2020	Browse	Kyle	

=== Television ===
Year	Title	Role	Notes
1991	Life Goes On	Mark	Episodes: "Life After Death", "Out of the Mainstream"
1992	Doing Time on Maple Drive	Joe	TV movie
1992	Melrose Place	Messenger	Episode: "Picture Imperfect"
1993	Double Deception	Burglar #1	TV movie
1993	Phenom	Burt	Episode: "Angela's Wild Ride"
1993	Sisters	Busboy	Episode: "The Best Intentions"
1994	Lifestories: Families in Crisis	Sean	Episode: "Confronting Brandon: The Intervention of an Addict"
1994	Married... with Children	Clerk	Episode: "Dial B for Virgin" Credited as Bodhi Pine Elfman
1994	Step by Step	Garry	Episodes: "Great Expectations", "Something Wild", "I'll Be Home for Christmas", Credited as Bodhi Pine Elfman
1995	Clerks	Ray	TV pilot
1996	Ellen	Surfer Dude	Episode: "Too Hip for the Room" Credited as Bodhi Pine Elfman
1996	The Faculty	Unknown	Episode: "The Brain Teaser"
1996	Hang Time	Bob	Episode: "Fake ID-ology"
1996–1997	3rd Rock from the Sun	Clerk / Orderly	Episodes: "My Mother the Alien", "I Brake for Dick" Credited as Bodhi Pine Elfman
1997	Ink	Kevin	3 episodes
1997	Hiller and Diller	Unknown	
1997	George & Leo	Bellboy	Episode: "The Halloween Show"
1998	Sliders	Trevor Blue	Episode: "Genesis" (as Bodhi Pine Elfman)
1998	Party of Five	Unknown	Episode: "Separation Anxiety" Credited as Bodhi Pine Elfman
1998	Hollyweird	Trey	TV movie
1998–2001	Dharma & Greg	Terry / Survivor / Ted	3 episodes
1999	Pirates of Silicon Valley	John Gilmore	Original TNT TV movie Credited as Bodhi Pine Elfman
2000	The Huntress	Toby Anders	Episode: "The Kid"
2000	Veronica's Closet	Neil	Episodes: "Veronica Loses Her Olive Again", "Veronica's Clips"
2000–2001	Freedom	Londo Pearl	Main cast; 11 episodes
2001	Providence	Suspicious Guy	Episode: "Falling"
2003	ER	Nicky	Episode: "Finders Keepers"
2003	Without a Trace	Chris Roland	Episode: "No Mas"
2003	Dragnet	Kevin O'Malley	Episode: "Daddy's Girl", aka "The 2003 series: L.A. Dragnet", as part of the Dragnet franchise
2003	Las Vegas	Steven	Episode: "Donny, We Hardly Knew Ye"
2003	Karen Sisco	Fred	Episode: "Nobody's Perfect"
2003	Coyote Waits	Odell Redd	Adapted novel Coyote Waits for television – aired on PBS
2004	Charmed	Kyle Donie	Episode: "Witch Wars"
2005	Fielder's Choice	Lou	TV movie
2005	Misadventures in Matchmaking	Andy	5 episodes
2009	The Mentalist	Rick Tiegler	Episode: "Russet Potatoes"
2010	CSI: Crime Scene Investigation	Rylan Gauss	Episode: "418/427"
2011	Handsome Sportz Klub	Leopold Von Gugenstein	3 episodes
2011	Prime Suspect	Paul Robie	Episode: "The Great Wall of Silence"
2012–2013	Touch	Avram Hadar	10 episodes
2014	Growing Up Fisher	Unknown	Episode: "Katie You Can Drive My Car"
2015	Code Black	Kenny	Episode: Black Tag
2015–2017	Criminal Minds	Peter "Mr. Scratch" Lewis	Episodes: "Mr. Scratch", "The Storm", "The Crimson King", "Mirror Image", "True North", "Wheels Up"
2016	Rizzoli & Isles	Josh Walker	Episode: "Ocean Frank"
