= Only a Lad =

Studio album by Oingo Boingo
- Released: June 19, 1981
- Recorded: December 1980 – February 1981
- Studios: Record Plant (Los Angeles); United Western (Hollywood); Cherokee (Hollywood); Westlake Audio (West Hollywood)
- Genres: New wave; ska
- Length: 38:12
- Labels: I.R.S.; A&M
- Producers: Oingo Boingo; Pete Solley

Oingo Boingo chronology
Oingo Boingo (1980)	Only a Lad (1981)	Nothing to Fear (1982)

Singles from Only a Lad
- 1. "Only a Lad" Released: May 1981; 2. "Little Girls" Released: 1981 (Australia)

Audio sample
- file; help

Only a Lad is the debut studio album by American new wave band Oingo Boingo, released in 1981 by A&M Records, following their self-titled EP.

== Composition ==
=== Music ===
The album's musical arrangements, by vocalist Danny Elfman and guitarist Steve Bartek, completed the group's evolution into a new wave rock band (see Oingo Boingo – The Mystic Knights Years). Only a Lad features complex and frequently changing time signatures and keys, often incorporating harmonies borrowed from jazz and 20th-century classical music.

=== Lyrics ===
Elfman claimed that many of the songs were inspired by newspaper articles he had read at the time and were "written as in-your-face facetious jabs". "Little Girls" courted controversy for its theme of underage relationships. At the time of release, Elfman described the song as being "about a character who has certain unacceptable inclinations" and later commented, "Out here in Hollywood, you see so much of that; the older guy's in the car with some young girl who essentially asks no questions." The music video features Elfman dancing inside a surreal, empty suburban house, joined by little people and teenage girls. The band members are later seen staring complacently in shop windows and drinking tea while Elfman's character walks down a street with an apparently underage girl. The video, directed by Elfman's brother Richard Elfman, was purportedly banned in Canada.

The most explicitly political track, "Capitalism", takes aim at "middle class socialist brat" protestors who "whine about the revolution" while themselves appearing to live in comfort. Similarly, "Perfect System" satirizes a utopia where society is manipulated to achieve happiness through "uniformity" and "continuity."

Discussing the songs' themes in 1983, Elfman commented that the intention was "to be angry and keep a sense of humor at the same time", explaining "the songs themselves may not be delivered real seriously, but there is a point which I intend not to be taken lightly" and that people should not "be forced to believe" any social or political agenda. In 2010, Elfman reflected, "I was always taking characters and singing from the point of view of a character. ... So it didn't necessarily reflect me". In 2014, Elfman stated that he "just basically make(s) fun of everybody", and that he "didn't see anybody as being protected". He elaborated: "To me, all organized political groups have a sense of absurdity to them. It's open to be mocked or satirized. If anything, I consider myself part of nothing, and any organized group was fair game to mockery, from my vantage point."

== Artwork ==
On the cover of the album, the drawing of a cat by Louis Wain that previously appeared on the cover of the Oingo Boingo EP is visible as a patch on the shirt of the Boy Scout. The cover is a parody of the Boy Scouts of America 1960 official handbook cover, illustrated by Norman Rockwell.

== Reception ==
Only a Lad was highly praised upon release, though its success was limited to the band's Southern California region. With the backing of Los Angeles radio station KROQ-FM, it established Oingo Boingo as a permanent fixture on the regional music scene.

Oingo Boingo were already known for exploiting their negative press coverage; the song "Imposter" was a response to "a couple of assholes at the LA Times." Rock critic Robert Christgau criticised Only a Lad as having "catchy vocals and spoiled overarrangements". Trouser Press writer Ira A. Robbins panned the album, stating that it featured "contrived bits swiped from the Tubes, XTC and Devo to diminish the impact of reasonably clever lyrics and thoroughly competent music." However, Robbins praised "On the Outside" for sounding "normal". In his review of Only a Lad, the Times' Terry Atkinson described the album as "the crassest sort of new wave."

In 2006, Danny Elfman reflected that he "loved bad reviews, something's got to fuel us."

== Legacy ==
In 2006, the National Review named "Capitalism" as one of the "50 greatest conservative rock songs." It is featured in the 2005 film Enron: The Smartest Guys in the Room.

"Only a Lad" is a playable track in the 2007 PlayStation 2 video game Guitar Hero Encore: Rocks the 80s.

In 2021, Rubellan Remasters reissued Only a Lad on limited edition colored vinyl, followed by an expanded edition CD with bonus tracks, including the Oingo Boingo EP.

== Track listing ==
All tracks are written by Danny Elfman, except "You Really Got Me" by Ray Davies.

Side one
No.	Title	Length
1.	"Little Girls"	3:44
2.	"Perfect System"	3:46
3.	"On the Outside"	3:39
4.	"Capitalism"	3:40
5.	"You Really Got Me"	4:40

Side two
No.	Title	Length
1.	"Only a Lad"	3:56
2.	"What You See"	3:43
3.	"Controller"	3:24
4.	"Imposter"	2:59
5.	"Nasty Habits"	4:06
Total length:		38:12

=== 2021 CD bonus tracks ===
All tracks are written by Danny Elfman, except "Violent Love" by Willie Dixon.

Oingo Boingo EP
No.	Title	Length
11.	"Only a Lad"	4:17
12.	"Violent Love"	2:37
13.	"Ain't This the Life (10-inch Version)"	3:38
14.	"I'm So Bad"	3:54
15.	"Ain't This the Life (12-inch Version)"	3:27

== Personnel ==
Oingo Boingo

- Danny Elfman – lead vocal, rhythm guitar
- Steve Bartek – lead guitar
- Richard Gibbs – keyboards, trombone
- Kerry Hatch – bass, vocals
- Johnny (Vatos) Hernandez – drums
- Sam "Sluggo" Phipps – saxes (tenor)
- Leon Schneiderman – saxes (baritone)
- Dale Turner – trumpet

Technical

- Pete Solley – co-producer
- Oingo Boingo – co-producers, mixing
- Steve Bartek – horn arrangements and charts
- Rick Ruggieri – mixing
- Steve Brown – engineer
- Dave Ahlert – assistant engineer
- Chuck Kirkpatrick – assistant engineer
- Brad Gilderman – assistant engineer
- Cary Pritikin – assistant engineer
- George Marino – mastering
- Chuck Beeson – art direction
- Chris Hopkins – illustration
- Dave Willardson – back cover photography
- Charlie White – back cover photography
- Rob Sinskey – inner sleeve photography
