= It's Better than Walking Out =

Song by Marlena Shaw

from the album Just a Matter of Time
- Released: 1976
- Label: Blue Note BN-XW790-Y
- Composer: L. Garrett/R. Taylor
- Producers: Tony Silvester & Bert DeCoteaux for Penumbra Music Company

"It's Better than Walking Out" is a single for Marlena Shaw in 1976.

== Background ==
The song was composed by Lee Garrett and Robert Taylor. It was the first single from Shaw's Just a Matter of Time album. In James Hamilton's New Spins section of Record Mirror, issue June 5, the record was referred to as a thudding hustler. In Sue Byrom's Singles section of the same issue, the speed of the music and catchy repeated chorus that could get some listeners was noted. The slick arrangement, the drums accentuating the backbeat and Shaw's phrasings were also noted. The Cash Box reviewer in the June 12 issue called it a driving disco and r&b cut.

== Airplay ==
For the week of May 22, Cash Box recorded the record being added to the R&B playlists of WAMO in Pittsburgh, WADS in Philadelphia, and WILD in Boston. It was also added to the playlist of WDAO in Dayton.

== Charts ==
"It's Better than Walking Out" made its debut in the Cash Box Top 100 R&B chart at 83 the week of June 12, 1976, spending a week on the chart.

The song peaked at no. 103 on the Billboard main chart (Bubbling Under) and at no. 74 on the R&B chart.

For the week ending June 26, 1976, "Better than Walking Out" was at no. 109 in the Billboard Bubbling Under The Hot 100 chart. It reached no. 10 on the Billboard Disco Action chart, Colony Records (New York) section.

In England, the song made the UK Disco Top 20 chart.

== Other versions ==
- Lee Garrett recorded his own version which appeared on his Heats for the Feats album that was released on Chrysalis CHR 1109 in 1976. It was actually an "Album Pick" by Record World in the March 27 issue.
- Denny McCaffrey covered "Better than Walking Out" which appeared on his 2014 album, Come On In.
