= The Girls of Huntington House =

- Genre: Drama
- Based on: The Girls of Huntington House by Blossom Elfman
- Written by: Paul Savage
- Directed by: Alf Kjellin
- Starring: Shirley Jones; Mercedes McCambridge; Pamela Sue Martin; William Windom; Sissy Spacek
- Theme music composer: Tom Scott
- Country of origin: United States
- Original language: English

Production
- Executive producer: Lee Rich
- Producers: Robert L. Jacks; Neil T. Maffeo
- Cinematography: Andrew Jackson
- Editors: Gene Fowler, Jr. Marjorie Fowler
- Running time: 74 minutes
- Production company: Lorimar Productions

Original release
- Network: ABC
- Release: February 14, 1973

The Girls of Huntington House is a 1973 television film directed by Alf Kjellin. The film is based on the 1972 novel of the same name written by Blossom Elfman and originally broadcast on the anthology series ABC Movie of the Week.

== Plot ==
Anne Baldwin arrives at Huntington House, a maternity home for pregnant minors. The school's principal Doris McKenzie is initially reluctant to hire Baldwin, because she has no degree. In class, Baldwin soon finds out she is unable to get through to the teens, of whom most are rebellious and aggressive. She constantly clashes with the school's newest student, 17-year-old Sara. Sara has been forced by her parents to enter the home and has been assigned the roommate of Gail; a model student who has a snobbish, dominant mother. Sara feels Baldwin is too old-fashioned and too introverted for contemporary moral standards/values and thus does not know the contemporary meaning of love and sex.

Inspired by Sara's attempts to make her open up, Baldwin introduces a more personal, social teaching structure. From this point, she bonds with several students, including Marilyn, who gives birth to a baby. Following a fight, Sara is fed up with Huntington House and leaves. Baldwin tries to stop her, but this results in a confrontation, during which Baldwin slaps Sara. During her absence, Baldwin decides not to report her to the authorities and after Sara's return, they become friends.

Nevertheless, Sara's attitude has become worse, having become depressed and constantly announcing she will give up her baby immediately after its birth. Baldwin knows that, secretly, Sara want to keep the baby, but she is pressured by her parents to give it up. On graduation day, Gail is reluctantly taken home by her vicious mother, who feels Gail is not treated the proper way at Huntington House. Sara announces she will not give up the baby, and, encouraged by Baldwin, leaves with her boyfriend Sandy instead. Baldwin is also inspired to follow her heart and admits to her romantic feelings for widower Sam Dutton, to whom she finally commits.

== Cast ==
- Shirley Jones as Anne Baldwin
- Mercedes McCambridge as Doris McKenzie
- Pamela Sue Martin as Gail Dorn
- William Windom as Sam Dutton
- Sissy Spacek as Sara
- Katherine MacGregor as Rose Beckwith
- Helen Page Camp as Nurse Caulfield
- Carol Speed as Marlene
- Tina Andrews as Tina
- Queenie Smith as Agnes Swernton
- Ruth Warshawsky as Mrs. Conover
- Barbara Mallory as Marilyn Dutton
- Darrell Larson as Sandy

== See also ==
- List of American films of 1973
