= Pushed to the Limit =

1992 film

- DVD Cover
- Directed by: Michael Mileham
- Written by: Mimi Lesseos
- Produced by: Mimi Lesseos; Robert Mariani
- Starring: Mimi Lesseos; Henry Hayashi; Verrel Reed; Barbara Braverman; Greg Ostrin; Rick Shaw; Frank Trejo
- Cinematography: Bodo Holst
- Edited by: Peter Cohen
- Music by: Miriam Cutler
- Distributed by: Casa do Vídeo; Curb/Esquire Films
- Release date: 1992
- Running time: 109 minutes
- Country: United States
- Language: English

Pushed to the Limit is a 1992 action feature film written by Mimi Lesseos and directed by Michael Mileham. Starring Mimi Lesseos and Verrel Lester Reed, the film is about a wrestling queen who finds out that a gangster is responsible for her brother's death and trains in kickboxing to avenge his death.

== Development ==
Prior to starting work on Pushed to the Limit, Mimi Lesseos was an experienced professional wrestler and she had experience working in make-up, acting and stunt work in a number of productions. She has stated that her interest in making a film of her own was in part a reaction to the exploitative roles which she had accepted in her earlier work, as she wished to portray a fit and strong female character who was not "sleazy or muscle-bound". Lesseos wrote, starred in and produced the work. Half of the $600,000 budget was provided through an investor, while she provided the other half, selling property and, at one point, traveling to Japan to raise money through her professional fights. While in Japan she found a distributor, and worldwide distribution was gained after taking the movie to the Cannes Film Festival.

== Cast ==
- Mimi Lesseos as Mimi
- Henry Hayashi as Harry Lee
- Verrel Reed as Vern (as Verrel Lester Reed Jr.)
- Barbara Braverman as Mom
- Greg Ostrin as John Cordon
- Rick Shaw as Fred
- Frank Trejo as Frank
- Michael M. Foley as Nick
- Amy Barcroft as Sheeba
- Christl Colven as Inga
- Terrance Curtis as Tony
- Alex Demir as Mike
- Al Giordano as Fernel
- Lorraine Hawkins as Terri

== Critical reception ==
Girls With Guns gave the film a poor review, writing "Lesseos makes for a decent fighter and a tolerable actress, though the subplot which has her as a showgirl in Vegas is irrelevant, inane and positively wince-inducing ... it's the story that really kills this ... having a female lead is a nice idea, but much more effort is needed, rather than thinking this is sufficient in and of itself. TV Guide also panned the film, offering "a film of the calibre of PUSHED TO THE LIMIT defies criticism by its multitude of mistakes, from Lesseos's self-aggrandizing screenplay to Michael Mileham's bungled direction—rendering it not good, not bad, but gleefully awful ... Thankfully, Michael Mileham's incompetent direction blunts any glorification of Lesseos. Mileham directs with his eyes closed--scenes are jumbled and the point of scenes obscured by characters who block the camera lens", and concludes with "as a truly bad film, you can't get any better--or worse--than this shoddy and cheapjack ego".

Despite the film itself having poor reviews, star Mimi Lesseos received recognition when the film was screened at the 2006 Action On Film International Film Festival 14 years after its initial release and she received nominations for both "Breakout Action Star" and "Female Action Performer of the Year".
