= Heart Be Still =

Single by Carl Graves
- B-side: "Breaking Up Is Hard to Do"
- Released: 1975
- Label: A&M 1757-S
- Composer(s): Lee Garrett, Robert Taylor
- Producer(s): Spencer Proffer

"Heart Be Still" is a song recorded by Canadian musician Carl Graves that was released as a single in 1975. It became a hit registering on both the Cash Box and Billboard charts.

== Background ==
The song was written by Lee Garrett and Robert Taylor. Hailing from Alberta, Canada, Graves was once in a group called the Skylarks who had a hit with the song "Wildflower". Graves had previous chart success with the song, "Baby, Hang Up the Phone".

The song was reviewed in the November 29 issue of Cash Box. The reviewer wrote that he offered a fresh approach to the R&B scene and that the song would catch the ears of young females. The youthfulness of his voice, the vitality and the balance against the bass gave it instant disco appeal and AM radio potential.

== Airplay and club action ==
In the January 17, 1976 issue of Billboard, Tom Moulton noted in his Club Dialog section that the DJ of Hippopotamus club in New York, Richie Pampanella reported a strong audience response to the single.

Cash Box reported in the February 28 issue that the single was added to the playlist of WILD in Boston. It had also moved from 19 to 12 on the list.

== Charts ==
"Heart Be Still" debuted at no. 84 on the Billboard Hot Soul Singles chart on January 3, 1976. At week eight, it reached its peak position of 26 on February 21.

The single debuted on the Cash Box Top 100 R&B chart at no. 83 for the week of January 17, 1976. It peaked at no. 33 on the chart for the week of February 28, 1976.
