= Jérôme Savary =

Argentine-French theater director (1942–2013)

Jérôme Savary (27 June 1942 – 4 March 2013) was an Argentine-French theater director and actor. His work has democratized and widened the appeal of musical theater in France, drawing together and blending such genres as opera, operetta, and musical comedy.

== Biography ==
Savary was born in Buenos Aires; his father was a writer and his mother the daughter of Frank W. Higgins, governor of New York (1905–1907). Savary moved to Paris at a very young age. Here, he studied music under Maurice Martenot, continuing his studies at the École nationale supérieure des arts décoratifs.

At nineteen, he moved to New York, where he associated with Lenny Bruce, Jack Kerouac, Allen Ginsberg, Count Basie, and Thelonious Monk. In 1962, he returned to Argentina to fulfill his military service requirements. He remained as an illustrator of dictionaries and a cartoonist, contributing to the same magazine as Copi.

In 1965, after returning to Paris, he created the "Compagnie Jérôme Savary", which evolved into "Le Grand Magic Circus" and finally into "Le Grand Magic Circus et ses animaux tristes". His version of Cabaret won awards in France (the Molière, 1987) and Spain (1993). He has remained active, producing such diverse works as La Périchole, Rigoletto, The Barber of Seville, La Légende de Jimmy, Marylin Montreuil, Mistinguett, Irma la Douce, and many other works.

After directing the Centre Dramatique National du Languedoc-Roussillon and the Carrefour Européen du Théâtre du 8e à Lyon, he headed the Théâtre National de Chaillot from 1988 to 2000.

In the field of opera Savary's first production was La Périchole in Geneva in 1982. Other important early work in the genre included Anacreon and Fra Diavolo at La Scala and several operas for Bregenz. He directed Le Comte Ory at Glyndebourne in 1997 and War and Peace for San Francisco in 1991. His last production was L'étoile in Geneva in 2009. From 2000 to 2007 was director of the Paris Opéra-Comique.

Turkish actor, writer and director Ferhan Şensoy worked in his theater for a while after his graduate as Savary's assistant.

Richard Elfman performed with Savary's Grand Magic Circus in the early 1970s and married the show's leading lady, Marie-Pascale (Elfman). Richard's brother, Danny Elfman, performed with the troupe when he was 18. The show, Zartan, included Danny's first public musical performance and compositions. Richard says his work with Jerome Savary and the Magic Circus helped inspire him to create the Mystic Knights of the Oingo Boingo.

Savary composed the song "Pleure" in Richard Elfman's film Forbidden Zone.

He died at Levallois-Perret, on 4 March 2013, of cancer, at the age of 70.

== Selected productions ==
=== Theater ===
1. Looking for/A la Recherche de Josephine – New Orleans for Ever (2006)
2. The Barber of Seville (2006)
3. Rigoletto (1996)
4. Carmen (2004)
5. Zazou, une histoire d’amour sous l’Occupation (2003)
6. Irma la Douce (2000)
7. La Cenerentola (2001)
8. Cabaret (1986)
9. Le Voyage dans la Lune (1986)
10. The Merry Widow (1983)
11. La Périchole (1982)

=== Film ===
1. La fille du garde-barrière (1975)
2. Le Boucher, la star et l'orpheline (1975)

=== Television ===
1. La Belle et la toute petite Bête (2003)
2. Mistinguett, la dernière revue (2001)
3. Les contes d'Hoffmann (2000)
4. La Périchole, la chanteuse et le dictateur (2000)
5. Le comte Ory (1997)
6. Y'a d'la joie!… Et d'l'amour (1997)
7. Nina Stromboli (1996)
8. Attila (1991)

== Honors ==
- Knight of the Légion d'honneur
- Knight of the Ordre des Arts et des Lettres
