= Benard Ighner =

American jazz musician

Benard Ighner (January 18, 1945 – August 14, 2017) was an American jazz singer, musician, songwriter and record producer.

== Biography ==
Ighner was born in Houston, Texas. After graduating in 1962 he moved with his parents to San Diego, California, and soon afterward joined the U.S. Army. He learned multiple instruments including piano, guitar, and saxophone, and after his discharge in 1965 recorded with Dizzy Gillespie. As Bernard Ito, he recorded a vocal version of the Gillespie composition "Con Alma" on Mercury Records, and for a while took over as Gillespie's featured singer on tour. Later, using the pseudonym Alexander St. Charles, he began working and recording with composer and arranger Lalo Schifrin on the 1971 album Rock Requiem, and co-wrote with Schifrin the song "Like Me" which he sang on the soundtrack of the film Dirty Harry. He also sang on David Axelrod's 1972 album, The Auction.

Ighner became a session singer in Hollywood. In 1974, he sang his own composition "Everything Must Change", a track on Quincy Jones' best-selling album Body Heat. Though not issued as a single, it is claimed that "the haunting masterwork went a long way toward selling the full-length album.." The song was later recorded as the title track of a 1976 album by Randy Crawford, as well as by Barbra Streisand, Peggy Lee, George Benson, Nina Simone, Nancy Wilson, Judy Collins, June Christy, Jean Carn, Oleta Adams, David Sanborn, and others.

Also in 1974, he produced and played on Marlena Shaw's album Who Is This Bitch, Anyway?, on Blue Note Records. The album included several of Ighner's compositions and is regarded as the apex of Shaw's recordings. The same year he recorded his song "Davy" as a duet with Shirley Bassey on her album Nobody Does It Like Me. Ighner's only solo album, Little Dreamer, was released on the Japanese Alfa label in 1978, and featured another recording of "Everything Must Change". Ighner also appeared on albums by Smokey Robinson, James Taylor and others, and sang on numerous advertising commercials. His compositions were recorded by musicians including Carmen McRae, Freddie Hubbard, Shirley Bassey, Jerry Butler and Sergio Mendes. In 1984, he teamed up again with Schifrin to perform and record with Sarah Vaughan on the album The Planet Is Alive...Let it Live! (also known as Let It Live - Sarah Vaughan Sings 'One World One Peace'), a series of settings of verse by Pope John Paul II.

In 1985, Ighner appeared and performed in the season one episode "The Big Piano Play-Off" of 227.

Ighner died of lung cancer in Houston in 2017, aged 72.
