= Who Is This Bitch, Anyway? =

Studio album by Marlena Shaw
- Released: 1975
- Recorded: June 12 and December 3–6, 1974
- Studio: The Record Plant, Los Angeles
- Genre: Jazz
- Length: 39:07
- Label: Blue Note; BN-LA397-G
- Producer: Benard Ighner

Marlena Shaw chronology
| Marlena Shaw Live at Montreux (1974) | Who Is This Bitch, Anyway? (1975) | Just a Matter of Time (1976) |

Who Is This Bitch, Anyway? is an album by American vocalist Marlena Shaw recorded in 1974 and released on the Blue Note label.

== Reception ==
The Allmusic review by Jason Ankeny awarded the album 4½ stars stating "A record as fierce and blunt as its title portends, Who Is This Bitch, Anyway? vaults Marlena Shaw into a brave new world of feminism and funk, updating the sophisticated soul-jazz approach of her previous records to explore a fast-changing musical, political, and sexual landscape... Not only Shaw's best-selling Blue Note release, Who Is This Bitch, Anyway? represents her creative apex as well".

Professional ratings
Review scores
| Source | Rating |
|---|---|
| Allmusic | 4.5/5 stars |

== Track listing ==
1. "You, Me and Ethel / Street Walking Woman" (Marlena Shaw / Loonis McGlohon, Byron Olson) – 6:20
2. "You Taught Me How to Speak in Love" (Molly Ann Leiken, Art Munson) – 3:52
3. "Davy" (Benard Ighner) – 5:26
4. "Feel Like Makin' Love" (Eugene McDaniels) – 5:00
5. "The Lord Giveth and the Lord Taketh Away" (Shaw) – 1:05
6. "You Been Away Too Long" (Ighner) – 3:07
7. "You" (Shaw) – 3:45
8. "Loving You Was Like a Party" (Ighner) – 4:17
9. "A Prelude for Rose Marie" (Olson) – 1:56
10. "Rose Marie (Mon Cherie)" (Wilma Callender, Ighner) – 4:19

- Recorded on June 12 (tracks 3 & 5), December 3 (tracks 2 & 8), December 4 (tracks 6 & 7), December 5 (tracks 1 & 4) and December 6 (tracks 9 & 10), 1974.

== Personnel ==
- Marlena Shaw – vocals
- Benard Ighner – piano, flugelhorn, arranger
- Michael Lang, Bill Mays – piano
- Larry Nash – electric piano, synthesizer
- Dennis Budimir, Larry Carlton, David T. Walker – guitar
- Chuck Domanico – bass
- Chuck Rainey – electric bass
- Harvey Mason – drums, wind chimes
- Jim Gordon – drums
- King Errison – conga
- Dale Oehler – arranger
- Byron Olson – arranger
- Unidentified strings, horns and woodwinds
