= Blossom Elfman =

American novelist

- Occupation: Novelist
- Children: Richard Elfman, Danny Elfman
- Relatives: Bodhi Elfman (grandson), Bridget Fonda (daughter-in-law), Anastasia Elfman (daughter-in-law)

Clare "Blossom" Elfman was an American novelist.

== Biography ==
She had two children: writer, director, and publisher Richard Elfman; and musician, composer, actor, and voice actor Danny Elfman. Their family is Jewish.

== Bibliography ==
- A House for Jonnie O. (1976)
- The Girls of Huntington House (1972) (this novel was successfully adapted as an ABC Movie of the Week in 1973)
- The Case of the Pederast's Wife (2005)

== Awards ==
- A House for Jonnie O., winner, the ALA Best Book for Young Adults Award, 1977
