= Aliens, Clowns & Geeks =

- Film poster
- Directed by: Richard Elfman
- Written by: Richard Elfman
- Starring: Bodhi Elfman
- Music by: Danny Elfman
- Release date: 2019 (Mexico City)
- Running time: 90 minutes
- Country: United States
- Language: English

Aliens, Clowns & Geeks (formerly titled Hipsters, Gangsters, Aliens and Geeks) is a 2019 American science fiction comedy film written and directed by Richard Elfman and starring Bodhi Elfman. The film features Verne Troyer in his final film appearance.

== Plot summary ==
Eddy Pine is a depressed, out-of-work actor in Los Angeles whose life is a mess after his sitcom gets canned. After a surreal encounter with two blonde women—who are actually biological drones controlled via Xbox controllers by masturbating green aliens on a spaceship—Eddy experiences a "medical miracle." He literally births a heavy, metallic black obelisk from his anus. This artifact is the "Key to the Universe," containing the secrets of interdimensional energy.

Immediately, Eddy becomes the target of an intergalactic tug-of-war. On one side are the Greens, reptilian-looking corporate aliens who view Earth as a reality show. On the other are the Clowns, led by the foul-mouthed, pint-sized Emperor Beezel-Chugg, an interdimensional tyrant who projects his consciousness to Earth to claim the relic. Eddy flees his apartment and seeks refuge with his sister Jumbo (a transgender woman, who also appears as a guy in a giant chicken suit) and Professor von Scheisenberg, a fringe scientist who understands the obelisk's cosmic importance.

The plot devolves into a violent, neon-soaked chase involving the Professor's assistants—the brilliant and lethal Svenson Sisters—and a group of Chinese gangsters who want the artifact for its resale value. As the Clowns launch a full-scale invasion, people are decapitated and mutilated in slapstick fashion. Eddy eventually learns he is the "Chosen One" simply because his anatomy could survive passing the artifact.

In the chaotic climax at the Professor’s lab, the Greens and Clowns face off in a bloody showdown. Eddy has to figure out how to activate the obelisk's true power to send the invaders back to their own dimensions. Amidst musical numbers and exploding heads, Eddy and his ragtag team of "geeks" successfully trigger the device, banishing the Emperor and the aliens. The film ends with the world safe (for now), though Eddy is left traumatized, and the group celebrates their survival with a manic "Mambo Diabolico" dance number.

== Cast ==
- Bodhi Elfman as Eddy Pine
- Verne Troyer as Emperor Beezel-Chugg
- Steve Agee as Jumbo
- French Stewart as Professor von Scheisenberg
- George Wendt as Father Mahoney
- Rebecca Forsythe as Helga Svenson
- Angeline-Rose Troy as Inga Svenson
- Nic Novicki as Fritz

== Release ==
The film premiered at the 2019 Morbido Film Fest in Mexico City. The film was also released as a drive-in double feature along with the director's cut of Forbidden Zone at the Valley Film Festival on January 30, 2021. It was then released on DVD and Blu-ray on June 7, 2022.

== Reception ==
The film has a 100% rating on Rotten Tomatoes based on eight reviews.

Josh Millican of Dread Central gave the film a positive review and wrote, "This is one of those films that can’t be compared to anything else–a uniquely bizarre experience with the ability to enrage, enthrall, but mostly entertain!"

Tony Sokol of Den of Geek awarded the film four stars out of five and wrote, "Aliens, Clowns & Geeks is silly, goofy, stupidly intelligent, and absolutely what a mad scientist would order."

Alan Ng of Film Threat rated the film a 7 out of 10 and wrote, "There are still filmmakers out there willing to tell stories just for the sake of irreverent fun..."
