= Little Girls (Oingo Boingo song) =

1981 song by Oingo Boingo

Single by Oingo Boingo

from the album Only a Lad
- B-side: "On the Outside"
- Released: 1981
- Genre: New wave; synth-pop; post-punk
- Length: 3:43
- Label: I.R.S.; A&M
- Songwriter: Danny Elfman
- Producers: Oingo Boingo; Pete Solley

Oingo Boingo singles chronology
"Only a Lad" (1981)	"Little Girls" (1981)	"Private Life" (1982)

Music video
- "Little Girls" on YouTube

"Little Girls" is a song by American new wave band Oingo Boingo and the opening track of their debut studio album, Only a Lad (1981). It was released as a single in Australia.

== Background ==
"Little Girls" was written by Danny Elfman after reading an article in a newspaper. The song was written as a satire and has a strong punk rock influence, as well as a horn arrangement. When asked about the song's darkly humorous lyrics in 2010, Elfman replied:

What made me write it? At that point I was just grabbing onto things that popped up in my head and taking characters and singing from their point of view. ... So it didn't necessarily reflect me...but it was just fun and I knew it was irreverent. I was out to offend everybody.

Elfman would reiterate this view in 2014, claiming that the song was an "in-your-face facetious jab." Elfman has occasionally offered other explanations; in a 1985 concert he jokingly suggested that the song was about how his girlfriend was so "very, very little" that "she fits in the palm of [his] hand."

"Little Girls" was described by Creative Loafing Tampa as one of the standout tracks of Only a Lad.

== Music video ==
The music video, directed by Elfman's brother Richard, depicts Elfman in an empty house dancing with girls and people with dwarfism, followed by on-lookers (portrayed by other members of Oingo Boingo) staring vacantly as he walks down a street with an apparent underage girl. The video features set pieces strongly reminiscent of German expressionist filmmaking, such as that seen in The Cabinet of Dr. Caligari (1920). It was originally banned in Canada and was later named "the creepiest music video of all time" by The Independent.
