= Dark at the End of the Tunnel =

Studio album by Oingo Boingo
- Released: February 20, 1990
- Recorded: May 1989
- Studios: Sunset Sound (Hollywood); Sunset Sound Factory (Hollywood)
- Genres: Alternative rock; ska
- Length: 47:46
- Label: MCA
- Producers: Danny Elfman, Steve Bartek, John Avila

Oingo Boingo chronology
The Best of Oingo Boingo: Skeletons in the Closet (1989)	Dark at the End of the Tunnel (1990)	Best O' Boingo (1991)

Singles from Dark at the End of the Tunnel
- 1. "Flesh 'N Blood" Released: 1989; 2. "Out of Control" / "Right to Know" Released: April 1990; 3. "Skin" Released: 1990; 4. "When the Lights Go Out" Released: 1990

Professional ratings
Review scores
Source	Rating
AllMusic	2.5/5 stars
Los Angeles Times	3/5 stars
The Rolling Stone Album Guide	1/5 stars

Dark at the End of the Tunnel is the seventh studio album by American new wave band Oingo Boingo, released in 1990 by MCA Records.

== Music ==
Dark at the End of the Tunnel marked Oingo Boingo's move toward a more pure pop sound, eschewing the hyper, frantic style exemplified on previous records for a more mainstream, less formally innovative approach, with an emphasis on emotional, positive lyrics.

By the time of the album's recording, frontman Danny Elfman had become a famed film composer, particularly in collaboration with Tim Burton. Two tracks on the album had previously emerged on movie soundtracks: "Try to Believe" first appeared as an instrumental in the 1988 film Midnight Run (scored by Elfman), and "Flesh 'N Blood" had first appeared on the soundtrack of Ghostbusters II (1989).

"Out of Control" was written after Elfman received letters from fans who were contemplating suicide. Conversely, "The Long Breakdown", an "epic, Western-tinged" track ending with a vision of death, was deemed by Elfman as "the most depressing song I've ever written. It's about a spiral down to the bottom." The hopeful "Try to Believe" was selected to be the closing track on Dark at the End of the Tunnel to "counterbalance" the album's darker subject matter.

"When the Lights Go Out" peaked at No. 15 on the Billboard Modern Rock Tracks chart in March 1990.

== Artwork ==
The cover art of the album depicts a portion of a painting entitled "Volcano", by artist Peter Zokosky.

A promotional version of the album was released on a vinyl picture disc, with one side featuring the album cover and the other side featuring a color photograph of the band.

== Reissue ==
In 2022, Rubellan Remasters announced that they would be issuing a remastered version of Dark at the End of the Tunnel on both colored vinyl and CD, the latter as an expanded edition with four bonus tracks.

== Track listing ==
All tracks are written by Danny Elfman.

No.	Title	Length
1.	"When the Lights Go Out"	4:11
2.	"Skin"	4:43
3.	"Out of Control"	4:12
4.	"Glory Be"	5:03
5.	"Long Breakdown"	4:39
6.	"Flesh 'N Blood"	4:19
7.	"Run Away (The Escape Song)"	4:20
8.	"Dream Somehow"	4:39
9.	"Is This"	3:27
10.	"Right to Know" (CD/cassette exclusive bonus track)	3:58
11.	"Try to Believe"	4:33
Total length:		47:46

2022 CD bonus tracks
No.	Title	Length
12.	"Out of Control (Funky Vocal Mix)"	7:15
13.	"Flesh 'N Blood (Extended Version)"	5:39
14.	"Try to Believe ("Midnight Run" Soundtrack Version)"	4:18
15.	"Out of Control (Power Mix)"	4:20

== Personnel ==
Oingo Boingo

- Danny Elfman – vocals
- John Avila – bass guitar, vocals
- Steve Bartek – guitars
- Carl Graves – keyboards, vocals
- Johnny "Vatos" Hernandez – drums, percussion
- Sam Phipps – tenor and soprano saxophones
- Leon Schneiderman – baritone sax
- Dale Turner – trumpet

Additional musicians

- Bruce Fowler – trombone
- Ralph Grierson – piano
- Kenny Kotwitz – accordion
- Brian Mann – accordion
- Yvonne S. Moriarity – French horn
- Maxine Waters – additional vocals ("Try to Believe")
- Julia Waters – additional vocals ("Try to Believe")

Technical

- Chris Lord-Alge – mixing
- Talley Sherwood – second engineer
- Bill Jackson – engineer
- Jeff Lord-Alge – engineer
- Jim Scott – additional engineering
- Csaba Petocz – additional engineering
- Brian Soucy – assistant engineer
- David Cragin – studio assistant
- Greg Fulginiti – mastering
- Vartan – art direction
- DZN, The Design Group – design
- Dennis Keeley – photography
