= Lost Voyage =

2002 television film by Christian McIntire

Lost Voyage is a 2002 (produced in 2000) supernatural thriller directed, edited and co-written by Christian McIntire that debuted as a Sci Fi Pictures TV-movie on the Sci Fi Channel.

== Plot ==
The movie opens in 1972, a young Aaron Roberts (8 years old) along with his grandmother watches as his father and stepmother board a small cruise ship, the Corona Queen. Before his father and stepmother depart on their honeymoon, they offer Aaron a gift (much later found to be a pocket knife), which he rejects, throwing it to the ground and criticizing his new stepmother, petulantly stating that “She’s not my mother!"; and his biological mother passed away. Later his father and stepmother discuss Aaron's behavior and decide to give him time to adjust. On the bridge of the Corona Queen, the captain and crew discover they are fast approaching a large sonar image, leading to a bizarre, scary, dark cloud formation the ship cannot escape. The frightened passengers run around the ship, panicked, and Aaron's father and stepmother cling to each other in their stateroom, as a bright light engulfs them.

Shifting to the present day (25 years later) the grown Aaron Roberts (Judd Nelson) is shown recording the story of the Mary Celeste, as he's become a paranormal researcher. A mysterious, black silhouette figure appears quietly in his office doorway. He tells Aaron that the similarities between the 2 cases (Mary Celeste and Corona Queen) are remarkable. Aaron contradicts him by saying that the Corona Queen has never been found. The figure moves away saying "We should all get on with our lives." and vanishes into the hall, as Aaron gets up to try and intercept the man. He bumps into a colleague, Mary, who verifies she saw no one leaving his office and tells him that the Corona Queen has been found adrift off the Bermuda Islands. We are then introduced to Dana Elway (Janet Gunn), an investigative reporter for a paranormal-based show, who finds the story of the Corona Queen being found exciting and newsworthy. and decides to fly out to the ship to capture the story, along with cameraman, Randall Banks, (Richard Gunn). Dana is told by her boss, Kaplan (Robert Pine) to accept Julie Largow (Scarlett Chorvat) as her newer, younger counterpart, who will not only be covering for her while Dana's on a lengthy upcoming vacation, but that Julie will be coming on this assignment with her; having no real choice, Dana agrees. Believing he would add human interest to the story, Dana decides to visit Aaron at his apartment and attempt to convince him to accompany her team to the Corona via helicopter. At first, Aaron refuses but after a dream taking him back to the tragic events on the Corona, he accepts. Also on the helicopter are salvage leader and rep for the cruise line that owned the Corona Queen, David Shaw (Lance Henriksen) and two of his salvage operators, Dazinger and Fields (Jeff Kober and Mark Sheppard). On the way to their destination during a violent storm across the ocean, they all discuss the Bermuda Triangle and wonder where the Corona Queen has been for so long. After the helicopter pilot finds the Corona Queen in the stormy waves, both teams and their gear are dropped from the helicopter to the ship deck, and the crews make their way through to the interior. As they explore the ship, which is found to be in remarkably good condition, they wonder if the damage found was the work of terrorists or pirates but question where the bodies of passengers and crew are, as the ship appears completely deserted.

While each of the new visitors to the Corona Queen start doing their jobs, eerie presences are sensed and strange things start to happen. Fields is the first killed by electric voltage. One by one, all see visions of their past or their dreams; for example Julie sees herself taking Dana's place and being offered a contract to sign, but after she does sign, we just hear her screams, are brought to a view of the ship from the outside. and that the others are seen looking for her. Later Randall is attacked and killed by a ghastly, ghostly Julie. When Dazinger and Aaron see 'Fields' wandering below ship while searching for Julie, Dazinger is killed by anchor chains falling on him, suffocating him. The remaining group members find the captain's log, and read that the Corona Queen had entered the mysterious dimension of the Bermuda Triangle. Before meeting his own tragic fate, the captain wrote that the crew and passengers have been slaughtered, the rest have simply vanished; the children were the last to disappear. One by one, all of the team members are killed, until it's down to just Aaron and Dana.

They barely manage to get away on the helicopter, summoned back earlier by Shaw when they found Fields dead and decided to leave, as the ship is once again swallowed up by the black clouds and storm, and sent back to where it had been for three decades. After the event, Dana is promoted to producer of her show and Kaplan is out, but finds it all bittersweet as she feels it came at the cost of the death of five people. Aaron is found in his office listening to his latest dictation, taken the day he was interrupted by the man in the doorway. As he listens he realizes that the man said "We should all get on with our lives. Good-bye, son." Rewinding the tape several times, hearing the word "son" makes him realize it was his father saying goodbye, and just after this Dana arrives at his door, as they had plans to go out to dinner. As they leave, the phone rings, but Aaron decides to let it go to the answering-machine. As the recording begins, we hear static and we travel with the static, along the wires, and end up at the Corona Queen.

== Cast ==
- Judd Nelson as Aaron Roberts
  - Mason Lucero as Young Aaron Roberts
- Janet Gunn as Dana Elway
  - Taylor Olandt as Young Dana Elway
- Jeff Kober as Dazinger
- Lance Henriksen as David Shaw
- Scarlett Chorvat as Julie
- Richard Gunn as Randall Banks
- Mark Sheppard as Fields
- Ray Laska as Parker
- Wendy Robie as Marie Burnett
- Robert Pine as Kaplan
- Donna Magnani as Shirrill
- Christabel Montgomery as Mabel
- Que Kelly as Make-Up Girl
- Bill Livingston as Pilot
- Ron Otis as Navigator
- Josh Cruze as Captain
- Benjamin Eaglin as Navigation
- Ron Otis as Helmsman
- Trevor Lee Baer as Ghost Boy
- Jackie Benoit as Aaron's Grandma
- Deborah Berry as Dana's Mom

== Crew ==
- Director, editor - Christian McIntire
- Writers - Patrick Phillips, Christian McIntire
- Producers - Phillip Roth, Jeff Beach, Ken Olandt
- Director of Photography - Todd Barron
- Music - Rick McHugh
- Production designer - David Huang
