= Freedom (TV series) =

American science fiction TV series (2000)

- Genre: Science fiction
- Created by: Hans Tobeason
- Starring: Holt McCallany; Scarlett Chorvat; Bodhi Elfman; Darius McCrary; Georg Stanford Brown; James Morrison; Françoise Yip; Nigel Johnson
- Theme music composer: Eddie Jobson
- Composers: Sean Callery; Eddie Jobson
- Country of origin: United States
- Original language: English
- No. of seasons: 1
- No. of episodes: 13 (6 unaired on UPN)

Production
- Production location: Canada
- Running time: 45 minutes
- Production companies: Silver Pictures Television; Pandaemonium Pictures Limited; Warner Bros. Television

Original release
- Network: UPN
- Release: October 27 – December 22, 2000

Freedom is an American science fiction television series that aired on the UPN network from October 27 to December 22, 2000. There were 13 episodes filmed, including the original pilot, but only 7 episodes were aired in the United States.

== Plot ==
After war breaks out in the Middle East, combined with an economic downturn that causes mass unemployment and homelessness in America, the President of the United States travels extensively to resolve the matter but Air Force One crashes and the President is presumed dead. The United States is taken over by the US military in what becomes an invisible coup, and the faction label themselves the "Regime". Four military personnel, from different sections of the uniformed services are arrested for unknown charges - one later reveals he was ordered to assassinate the President and refused, resulting in false charges being brought against him - and remanded to prison, where they are later freed by unknown rebels. The four join up with a wider resistance movement against the military government in order to restore the Constitution and bring freedom back to the people.

== Cast ==
- Holt McCallany as Owen Decker
- Scarlett Chorvat as Becca Shaw
- Bodhi Elfman as Londo Pearl
- Darius McCrary as James Barrett
- Georg Stanford Brown as Walter Young
- James Morrison as Colonel Tim Devon
- Françoise Yip as Jin
- Nigel Johnson as Billy

== Production ==
The original pilot was reshot with the eventual series cast.

== Episodes ==
No.	Title	Directed by	Written by	Original release date	Prod. code
TBA	"Pilot"	Corey Yuen	TBD	Unaired	296728
1	"Alpha Dogs"	Bryan Spicer	Hans Tobeason	October 27, 2000	226851
2	"The Chase"	Paul Abascal	Jack Bernstein	November 3, 2000	226852
3	"Assassins"	Jeff Woolnough	Lindsay Sturman	November 10, 2000	226855
4	"Enemy"	Ian Toynton	Jon Cowan & Robert Rovner	November 17, 2000	226853
5	"Freezone"	Oley Sassone	Tracy Friedman	November 24, 2000	226854
6	"Siege"	Oley Sassone	Andrew Dettmann & Daniel Truly	December 1, 2000	226856
7	"Lone Wolf"	David Wu	John Turman	December 22, 2000	226857
8	"Thieves"	Don Kurt	TBD	Unaired	226858
9	"Livewire"	Vern Gillum	TBD	Unaired	226860
10	"Mind Game"	Terrence O'Hara	TBD	Unaired	226861
11	"Return"	Paul Abascal	TBD	Unaired	226859
12	"Ransom"	Don Kurt	TBD	Unaired	226862

== Broadcast ==
The episodes that were unaired in the United States aired internationally, and the full series is still occasionally broadcast in Brazil.
