= Scarlett Chorvat =

American actress

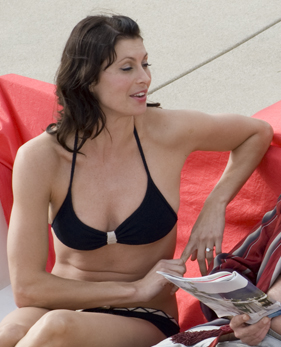
- Chorvat on the set of Narcissus Dreams, 2009, Malibu, California
- Occupations: Model, actress
- Years active: 2000–2018

Scarlett Chorvat is an American model and actress.

Chorvat graduated from Barbizon Modeling and Acting School in Michigan.

Her first role was in 2000, in the main cast of the UPN series Freedom; UPN cancelled the series and pulled it off air after seven episodes. Her last role was in the 2018 short film, The Liquid Psychologist. In addition to acting, she has modelled, appearing on magazine covers, advertising and TV commercials.

== Filmography ==
Note: Film, unless otherwise noted

Year	Title	Role	Notes
2000	Freedom	Becca Shaw	Main cast
2001	The District	Kitty	5 episodes
2001	Lost Voyage	Julie Largo	TV movie
2001	Stop at Nothing	London	TV movie
2002	Push, Nevada	Mary Sloman	Main cast
2002	Frank McKlusky, C.I.	Woman in ladies room	
2002	Buying the Cow	Katie Madison	
2002	Lost (II)	Sondra	Short film
2004	Entourage	Carol	Episode "New York"
2004	Dodgeball: A True Underdog Story	Joyce	
2004	DKNY Road Stories	Kate	Short film
2005	Taylor	Taylor Buchard	
2006	Nip/Tuck	Natalie	Episode "Gala Gallardo"
2006	Bull Run	Dina	
2006	Boston Legal	Sandy	Episode "Race Ipsa" (uncredited)
2006	Broken	girl	(uncredited)
2007	The Perfect Sleep	Tatiana	
2007	24	Elena	Episode "Day 6: 6:00 p.m.-7:00 p.m."
2008	Metal Gear Solid 4: Guns of the Patriots	Screaming Mantis	Video game, likeness and motion capture
2008	Born in the USA	na -	TV movie
2008	The Middleman	Irina Dubrovna	Episode "The Vampiric Puppet Lamentation"
2008	Shattered!	Dina	
2009	Narcissus Dreams	Grace	Short film
2009	Mercy	Woman concierge	
2010	Crazy on the Outside	Cindy	
2010	Black & White	Mother	Short film
2010	The Event	Laura Sterling	Episode "I Know Who You Are"
2011	Silver Case	Woman	
2012	Hidden Moon	Natasha	
2017	This Christmas	na -	
2018	The Liquid Psychologist	Beverly Hills Socialite	Short film
