= Oingo Boingo (EP) =

EP by Oingo Boingo
- Released: September 17, 1980
- Studios: Sound Arts (Los Angeles); Indigo Ranch (Malibu)
- Genres: New wave; ska
- Length: 10-inch – 14:05; 12-inch – 13:49
- Label: I.R.S.
- Producers: Michael Boshears, Jo Julian

Oingo Boingo chronology
| Oingo Boingo (1980) | Only a Lad (1981) |

Oingo Boingo is the debut EP by American new wave band Oingo Boingo, released in 1980 by I.R.S. Records.

== Background ==
The EP was recorded as a promotional record known as the Demo EP. The band distributed it on 10-inch vinyl prior to being signed by a record label. It was produced by Michael Boshears and Jo Julian. The artwork was designed by Charlie Unkeless, who, along with Sean Riley, painted the covers using airbrushes, stencils, water sprayers, and mesh bags. They created 130 separate signed and numbered covers.

The EP was then picked up by I.R.S. Records and released commercially as the Oingo Boingo EP, with the track "Forbidden Zone" (recorded for the then-unreleased movie of the same name) replaced by a ska cover of Willie Dixon's "Violent Love". An edited version of "Forbidden Zone" was later released on the film's soundtrack album, but the complete original recording, as included on the Demo EP, has never been re-released.

Oingo Boingo was initially issued on 10-inch vinyl, but later reissued on 12-inch vinyl and cassette. The cover features an illustration of a cat by artist Louis Wain. The 12-inch reissue replaced "Ain't This the Life" with a new recording. The song "Only a Lad" was subsequently re-recorded for the band's first album, Only a Lad (1981).

The 2021 Rubellan Remasters CD of the Only a Lad album contains the 10-inch EP, as well as the re-recorded "Ain't This the Life", as bonus tracks. In 2023, Rubellan reissued the EP on vinyl, which also included all five tracks.

== Track listing ==
All songs written by Danny Elfman, except "Violent Love", by Willie Dixon.

Side one

1. Only a Lad – 4:18
2. Violent Love – 2:38

Side two

1. Ain't This the Life – 3:30
2. I'm So Bad – 3:56

== Personnel ==
Precise musician credits and duties are unknown.

Technical credits adapted from 2023 Rubellan Remasters reissue, except where noted:

Technical

- Jo Julian – producer ("Only a Lad", "Violent Love", "Ain't This the Life" 10-inch version)
- Michael Boshears – producer ("Ain't This the Life" 12-inch version, "I'm So Bad")
- Jim Cypherd – engineer, re-mixing
- Frank DeLuna – mastering
- Bob Walter – re-mixing
- Rick Bowls – re-mixing
- Jed the Fish – "electromagnetic rejuvenation"
- Carl Grasso – art direction
- Louis Wain – front cover painting
