= You're My Everything (Lee Garrett song) =

Single by Lee Garrett

from the album Heat for the Feets
- A-side: "You're My Everything"
- B-side: "Love Enough for Two"
- Released: 1976
- Length: 3:00
- Label: Chrysalis CHS 2087
- Composer(s): Lee Garrett / Robert Taylor
- Producer(s): Eric Malamud, Tom Sellers

"You're My Everything" is a song by Lee Garrett, released as a single in 1976. His only hit, it did well in the UK.

== Background ==
"You're My Everything" was written by Lee Garrett and Robert Taylor. It was produced by Eric Malamud and Thomas Sellers.

While the album was getting airplay, Garrett appeared at the Chrysalis Records Open House event in Los Angeles in April. He was pictured in the April 24 issue of Record World with Terry Ellis and Chris Wright the co-chairman for the label.

The song was covered by East Side Beat in 1993.

== Airplay ==
Garrett's album Heat for the Feets was getting airplay at KPFT-FM in Houston leading up to the week of April 24.

For the week of May 8, "You're My Everything" was added to the R&B play lists of WOL in Washington and KYAC in Seattle.

For the week of May 15, the song had been added to the pop playlists of two Philadelphia radio stations, WIFI and WIBG. It was also added to the playlist of R&B station, KNOK in Fort Worth.

For the week of June 19, "You're My Everything" was on the rise in the playlist of WPEZ in Pittsburgh. It was also added to the playlist of WILD in Boston.

== Charts ==
=== Record World ===
For the week of May 8, 1976, "You're My Everything" made its debut on the Record World 101 - 150 Singles Chart. On June 12, it was at 101. On June 26, it made its debut in the Record World Singles Chart. It peaked at no. 94 on its second week on July 3.

=== Cash Box ===
For the week of May 8, "You're My Everything" made its debut in the Cash Box Looking Ahead to the Top 100 chart at 113. The following week (May 15) it made its debut at no. 92 in the Cash Box Top 100 Singles chart. It also debuted that week at no. 100 in the Cash Box Top 100 R&B chart. It peaked at no. 67 in its seventh week on July 3 in the Cash Box Top 100 Singles chart. It also peaked at no. 83 on the same week having spent eight weeks in the Cash Box Top 100 R&B chart.

=== Billboard ===
It peaked at numbers 58 and 85 on the Billboard charts and no. 15 in the UK.

=== UK charts ===
Record Mirror

For the week of May 15, 1976, "You're My Everything" was at no. 1 in the Record Mirror Star Breakers chart.

The song debuted on the Record Mirror Top 50 British Singles chart at no. 41 on the week of June 5. It had also moved down from no. 10 to no. 13 on the UK Disco Top 20 chart that week. On the UK Soul Top 20, it had moved up six notches from 18 to 12.

=== Chart summary ===
Chart 1976
Publication & chart	Peak	Period	Notes
(US) Billboard Hot 100	58	May 22 - July 4	
(US) Cash Box Top 100 Singles	67	May 15 - July 3	
(US) Record World The Singles Chart	94	June 26 - July 3	
(UK) Record Mirror Record Mirror Star Breakers	1	May 15 - May 22	
(UK) Record Mirror British Top 50 Singles	15	May 29 - July 10	
(UK) Record Mirror UK Disco Top 20	5	May 29 - July 17	
(UK) Record Mirror UK Soul Top 20	9	May 22 - July 24	

== Musicians ==
- Jerry Peters – Clavinet
- Greg Mathieson – Fender Rhodes, Organ
- Jerry Peters – Fender Rhodes
- June Millington – Background Vocals
- Jean Millington – Background Vocals
- Wendy Haas – Background Vocals
- Brie Howard – Background Vocals
- Padi Macheta – Background Vocals
- Chuck Findley
- Ernie Watts
- Harvey Mason Sr
- Lee Garrett
- Lee Ritenour
- Scott Edwards
- Steve Madaio
- Tom Scott

== East Side Beat version ==
The East Side Beat version was released on FFRR FCD207 in 1993. It spent one week in the UK chart, peaking at no. 65 on May 29, 1993.
