= Streets of Rage (film) =

1994 English language film directed by Richard Elfman

- DVD Cover
- Directed by: Aristide Sumatra
- Screenplay by: Richard Elfman; Mimi Lesseos
- Story by: Mimi Lesseos
- Produced by: Mimi Lesseos; Steve Lieb
- Starring: Mimi Lesseos
- Cinematography: Nick Mendoza Jr.
- Edited by: Peter Lonsdale
- Music by: Miriam Cutler
- Distributed by: Monarch Home Video; Image Entertainment
- Release date: 1994
- Running time: 84 minutes
- Country: United States
- Language: English

Streets of Rage is a 1994 American action crime film directed by Richard Elfman (credited as Aristide Sumatra) and co-written by Elfman and Mimi Lesseos, based on a story by Lesseos. The film stars Lesseos and Oliver Page.

== Premise ==
A Los Angeles reporter who is a former Special Forces commando investigates a child prostitution ring.

== Cast ==
- Mimi Lesseos as Melody Sails
- Oliver Page as Lunar
- Christopher Cass as Ryan McCain
- Ira Gold as Steven
- Juli James as Candy
- Gokor Chivichyan as Gokor
- James Michael White as Nick
- Tony Gibson as Harrison
- Lee Wessof as Max
- Shenin Siapinski as Flash
- Thyra Metz as Billie
- Darline Harris as Josie
- Carl Irwin as Butler

== Reception ==
Entertainment Weekly gave the film a "C" grade, stating that Oliver Page's portrayal of the antagonist was "pure textbook" but crediting Lesseos as "the sexiest head-butter in B movies".
