= Mimi Lesseos =

American wrestler and actress

Personal information
- Born: Mimi Diane Lesseos; February 25, 1964 (age 62) California, United States

Professional wrestling career
- Ring name: Magnificent Mimi
- Billed height: 5 ft 8 in (173 cm)
- Billed weight: 130 lb (59 kg)
- Debut: 1988
- Retired: 1994

Mimi Diane Lesseos (born February 25, 1964) is an American female professional wrestler, actress, model and stuntwoman also known by the ring name Magnificent Mimi.

== Early life ==
Lesseos was raised in Hollywood, California. She is the youngest of five children born to a Greek father and a Latin mother. She began martial arts lessons at the age of six.

== Professional wrestling career ==
=== American Wrestling Association (1988–1990) ===
In 1988, Lesseos debuted in the American Wrestling Association. She competed against women such as Candi Devine and Lori Lynne (formerly Colonel Ninotchka of Gorgeous Ladies of Wrestling) to become the top contender for the AWA World Women's Championship, which was held by Madusa Miceli. Miceli refused to grant her singles matches, which caused Lesseos to interrupt Miceli's title defenses against other contenders, such as Susan Sexton and Brandi Mae. She also teamed with Wendi Richter against Miceli and Sylvia (wife and valet of Robert Fuller) in a series of tag team matches. She was eventually rewarded with singles matches against Miceli. They feuded throughout the summer and fall of 1988, but Lesseos was unable to win the title. While working in the AWA, Lesseos was featured in the December 1989 issue of Playboy magazine posing with the AWA World Women's Championship belt, even though she never held the title.

=== Late career (1990–1994) ===
After the AWA closed, Lesseos joined the Ladies Professional Wrestling Association. She became a contender for the LPWA Championship and competed against women such as Malia Hosaka, Sindy Paradise, Dawn Marie, Jan Flame, and La Gata. She also formed a tag team with Denise Storm. The duo feuded with Terri Power and Reggie Bennett. She retired in 1994.

== Acting career ==
After retiring from professional wrestling in 1994, Lesseos appeared in numerous television series films as both an actress and stuntwoman. She has written, produced, and starred in several motion pictures, including Pushed to the Limit (1992), Beyond Fear (1993), Streets of Rage (1994), Personal Vendetta (1995) and Double Duty (2009). Her credits also include Million Dollar Baby, Gangs of New York, The Scorpion King, Man on the Moon, The X-Files, Dr. Quinn, Medicine Woman, and Final Impact. She was also the longtime stuntwoman for Jane Kaczmarek on Malcolm in the Middle.

== Personal life ==
Lesseos is the single mother of twin children.
