= Carl Graves =

- Origin: Alberta, Canada
- Occupation: Musician
- Instruments: Vocals, keyboard, percussion
- Years active: 1960s–present
- Labels: A&M Records, Sterling Silver Pro
- Formerly of: Soul Unlimited, Skylark, Oingo Boingo

Carl Graves is a musician from Calgary, Alberta, Canada. He has been a member of various groups in his career and had a number of hits in the 1970s.

== Early life and education ==
Graves is from Alberta, Canada, and has been in bands since high school. Graves studied at the Royal Conservatory of Music in Toronto and completed his studies in jazz music.

== Career ==
Achieving a degree of local fame in Canada, he was a member of the group Soul Unlimited. He later played percussion for Skylark and was also their third lead singer.

His hits during the 1970s include "Baby Hang Up the Phone", "Heart Be Still", and "Hey Radio". "Heart Be Still", written by Lee Garrett and Robert Taylor, debuted at no. 84 on the Billboard Hot Soul Hits singles chart on January 3, 1976. At week eight, it reached its peak position of 26 on February 21. It debuted on the Cashbox Top 100 R&B chart at no. 83 for the week of January 17, 1976. It peaked at no. 33 on the chart for the week of February 28, 1976. He also recorded the single "Sad Girl", which eventually peaked at no. 46 in the Record World R&B Singles chart on May 28, 1977.

From 1988 until 1994, he played keyboards and sang background vocals in the band Oingo Boingo. He currently performs with the group Oingo Boingo Former Members.
