= The Mystic Knights of the Oingo Boingo =

American street theatre troupe

- Origin: Los Angeles, California, United States
- Years active: 1972–1979
- Past members: Richard Elfman; Danny Elfman; Gene Cunningham; Matthew Bright; Ernie Fosselius; Leon Schneiderman; George Jay; Arla Dietz; William Winant; Stan Ayeroff; Jan Munroe; Marie Lalanne; Lori Erenberg; William Folwell; Musti Faun; Jon Gold; Josh Gordon; Todd Manley; Dale Turner; Sam Phipps; Brad Kay; Gisele Lindley; Charlie Unkeless; Miriam Cutler; Steve Bartek; Joe Berland; Timm Boatman; Tom Pedrini; John Hernandez; Craig Pallett

The Mystic Knights of the Oingo Boingo was an American surrealist street theatre troupe, formed by performer and director Richard Elfman in 1972. The group was led by Richard until 1976, when his brother Danny Elfman took over. The group evolved into an experimental musical theatre group, performing songs from the 1930s-40s and original material.

In 1979, Danny Elfman wished to pursue a new direction as a dedicated rock band and the group reformed as Oingo Boingo. Several Mystic Knights band members continued with the new band including Steve Bartek, Leon Schneiderman, Dale Turner, Sam "Sluggo" Phipps, and Johnny "Vatos" Hernandez.

== History ==
=== Early years (1972–76) ===
The Mystic Knights of the Oingo Boingo was formed in late 1972 by Richard Elfman, and was primarily a street theater performance group. The name was inspired by a fictional secret society on the Amos 'n' Andy TV series called The Mystic Knights of the Sea. Most of the members performed in whiteface and clown makeup.

Richard Elfman's younger brother, Danny, joined the group as musical director, after returning from a year traveling Africa. Musical performance grew to become a core feature of the group’s act, with an eclectic repertoire ranging from Cab Calloway covers to instrumentals in the style of Balinese gamelan, Russian ballet music, and original material. This version of the band employed as many as 15 musicians at any given time, playing over 30 instruments, including some instruments built by band members.

While never released, a number of the group's songs of that period were recorded as early as 1974. Two of them, "Chedranian National Anthem" and a cover of Irving Berlin's "Monkey Doodle Doo" (from the Marx Brothers film The Cocoanuts), were aired on the Dr. Demento radio show in August and September of that year, marking the ensemble's first radio exposure.

=== Danny Elfman’s leadership (1976–79) ===
As Richard Elfman's interest shifted to filmmaking, he passed leadership of the band to Danny. The group gained a following in Los Angeles, and appeared as contestants on The Gong Show in 1976, winning the episode they appeared on with 24 points out of a possible 30. The Gong Show presentation included an accordion, a purple dragon and a gaseous rocket-man.

Later in 1976, The Mystic Knights of the Oingo Boingo released "You Got Your Baby Back", a doo-wop style novelty single about kidnapped heiress Patty Hearst. Both this track and the B-side "Ballad of the Caveman" were written and sung by Danny Elfman. The band featured in the 1976 Martin Brest film Hot Tomorrows performing the songs "St. James Infirmary" and "42nd Street".

Under the younger Elfman's leadership, the troupe made a transition away from street theater to multimedia musical shows in theaters and clubs around Los Angeles, which is depicted in the bulk of surviving video and audio footage. Musical performances were often augmented by humorous skits, costume changes, and projected short films and animations, including "Tender Lumplings" (which would be revived as a song many years later by Oingo Boingo).

In interviews detailing his musical influences, Danny Elfman has maintained that during much of his years with The Mystic Knights, "I lived in my head back in the early part of the [20th] century, long before I was born; I didn't want to listen to music recorded after 1935." This is strongly evidenced in the original material he wrote and composed for the band during this time, taking cues from the music of Duke Ellington and Django Reinhardt in songs such as "Because of You (Hold Tight)" and "I Must Be Dreaming" (both recorded in demo form in 1978). Steve Bartek became a member of The Mystic Knights in 1975 partly due to his ability to play guitar in a Django Reinhardt style. Some of the earliest songs to become future Oingo Boingo staples began to appear around this time, including "Goodbye, Goodbye" and early versions of their cover of Willie Dixon's "Violent Love". Cab Calloway songs such as "Minnie The Moocher" and "St. James Infirmary Blues" continued to be staples of Mystic Knights setlists; long after the band had transformed into Oingo Boingo, "Minnie The Moocher" returned to the band's setlist for a short period in 1989-1990.

In 1977-78, Richard Elfman produced the movie Forbidden Zone with a cast mostly comprising band members and friends, later premiered in 1980. In one scene, Danny, as Satan, sings a version of "Minnie the Moocher" with lyrics adapted for the movie plot. In another, Richard sings the 1920s novelty song "The Yiddishe Charleston". The movie attained cult status.

During 1978-79, Danny Elfman introduced more original songs into the band’s set. With the group now sometimes billed as simply "The Mystic Knights", the new songs featured more rock, ska and highlife influences while maintaining threads of the band's pre-rock musical idioms. The theme song for Forbidden Zone was also written and recorded around this time, described by Danny Elfman as the first song he consciously wrote and arranged for electric instrumentation—marking the beginning of a new direction.This was aided by the recent addition of drummer Johnny "Vatos" Hernandez in 1978, who would gain his "Vatos" nickname from a persona he would take on in performances of the song "Cruisin".

In mid-1979, Danny decided to officially reform The Mystic Knights as a dedicated rock band with a new musical style and no theatrical elements, shortening the name to Oingo Boingo. Many of the prior members left, while Bartek, Hernandez, Schmidt and a horn trio of Phipps, Schneiderman and Turner remained. A selection of songs from the late Mystic Knights set were retained and reworked in the band’s new musical style, including "Ain't This The Life", "Goodbye Goodbye" and "Violent Love".

== Discography ==
- "You Got Your Baby Back" / "Ballad Of The Caveman" (Pelican Records, 1976)

== Filmography ==
- I Never Promised You a Rose Garden (1977)
- Hot Tomorrows (1977)
- Forbidden Zone (1980)
