= Marlena Shaw =

American jazz, blues and soul singer (1939–2024)

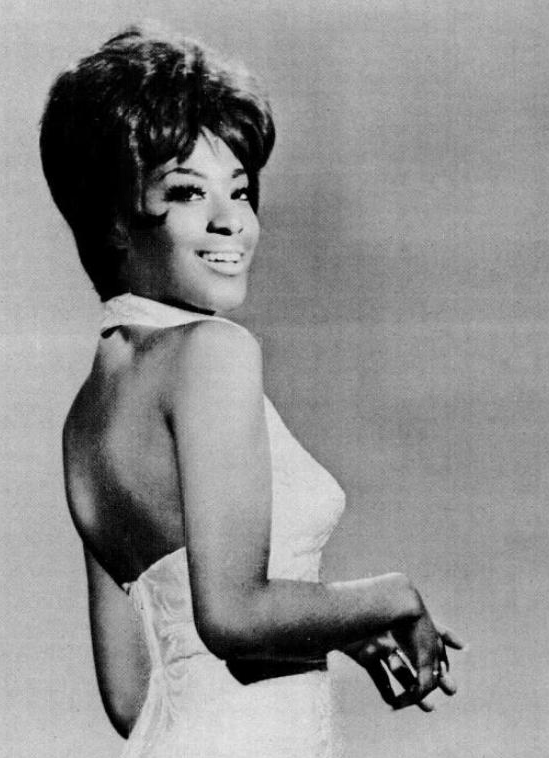
- Shaw in 1967

Background information
- Born: Marlina Burgess; September 22, 1939; New Rochelle, New York, U.S.
- Died: January 19, 2024 (aged 84)
- Genres: R&B; jazz; soul
- Occupation: Singer
- Instruments: Vocals; piano
- Years active: 1967–2024
- Labels: Cadet; Blue Note; Columbia; Verve

Marlina Burgess (September 22, 1942– January 19, 2024), professionally known by her stage name Marlena Shaw, was an American singer. Shaw began her singing career in the 1960s and continued to perform until her death. Her music has often been sampled in hip hop music, and used in television commercials.

== Background ==
Marlena Shaw was born in New Rochelle, New York. She was first introduced to music by her uncle Jimmy Burgess, a jazz trumpet player. In an interview with The New York Times, she told the reporter: "He [Jimmy Burgess] introduced me to good music through records – Dizzy [Gillespie], Miles [Davis], a lot of gospel things, and Al Hibbler, who really knows how to phrase a song." In 1952, Burgess brought her on stage at the Apollo Theater in Harlem to sing with his band. Shaw's mother did not want Marlena to go on tour with her uncle at such a young age. Shaw enrolled in the New York State Teachers College in Potsdam (now known as the State University of New York at Potsdam) to study music but she later dropped out.

== Career ==
Shaw began to make singing appearances in jazz clubs whenever she could spare the time. The most notable of these appearances was in 1963 when she worked with jazz trumpeter Howard McGhee. She was supposed to play at the Newport Jazz Festival with McGhee and his band, but left the group after getting into an argument with one of the band members. Later that year, she got an audition with Columbia label talent scout John Hammond. Shaw did not perform well during the audition because she was too nervous. Undeterred, she continued to play small clubs until 1966. Her career took off in 1966 when she landed a gig with the Playboy Club chain in Chicago. It was through this gig that she met with representatives of the Chess Records music label, and soon signed with them. She released her first two albums on their subsidiary Cadet Records. A 1969 album track "California Soul", a funk-soul tune written by Ashford & Simpson and originally issued as a single by American pop quintet The 5th Dimension, later became a staple of the UK rare groove scene. This song has appeared in television commercials for Dockers, KFC and Dodge Ram trucks. Unable to find her own style at Chess, she moved to the jazz-oriented Blue Note Records in 1972.

In 1977 she released an LP Sweet Beginnings on Columbia that contained: "Yu Ma / Go Away Little Boy", a medley containing the old Goffin and Carole King standard, originally recorded by Nancy Wilson. The album also contained the track "Look at Me, Look at You", again popular on the UK rare groove scene. She sang the theme song "Don't Ask to Stay Until Tomorrow" from the 1977 film Looking for Mr. Goodbar, that is also found on its soundtrack. She also recorded a disco era remake of "Touch Me in the Morning", also on Columbia Records.

In 1982 Marlena recorded the Gary Taylor ballad called "Without You in My Life" from the LP Let Me in Your Life, that was jointly produced by Johnny Bristol and Webster Lewis on South Bay Records. This had moderate chart success in the US. In 1983 she recorded the vocals for "Could It Be You", a track by Phil Upchurch on his Name of the Game album.

Shaw continued to perform and record. In 1999, 2001 and again in 2007, Shaw was one of the performers at the North Sea Jazz Festival in the Netherlands.

== Death ==
Shaw died on January 19, 2024, at the age of 84.

== Discography ==
=== Albums ===
Year	Album	Chart positions			Label
Year	Album	US	US R&B	US Jazz	Label
1967	Out of Different Bags	—	—	—	Cadet
1969	The Spice of Life	—	—	—	Cadet
1972	Marlena	—	—	—	Blue Note
1973	From the Depths of My Soul	—	—	—	Blue Note
1974	Marlena Shaw Live at Montreux	—	—	—	Blue Note
1975	Who Is This Bitch, Anyway?	159	47	8	Blue Note
1976	Just a Matter of Time	—	—	25	Blue Note
1977	Sweet Beginnings	62	14	12	Columbia
1978	Acting Up	171	—	—	Columbia
1979	Take a Bite	—	—	—	Columbia
1982	Let Me in Your Life	—	—	—	South Bay
1987	It Is Love (Recorded Live at Vine St.)	—	—	7	Verve
1988	Love Is in Flight	—	—	20	Polydor
1996	Dangerous	—	—	—	Concord Jazz
1997	Elemental Soul	—	—	—	Concord Jazz
2002	Live in Tokyo	—	—	—	441 Records
2004	Lookin' for Love	—	—	—	441 Records
"—" denotes releases that did not chart.

==== As guest ====
With Benny Carter

- Songbook (MusicMasters, 1996)
- Songbook Volume II (MusicMasters, 1997)

With others

- Buddy Montgomery, Ties of Love (Landmark, 1987)
- T-square, Vocal^{2} (or Vocal Square) (Sony Music Entertainment (Japan), 2002)

=== Singles ===
==== As lead artist ====
List of charting and certified singles as a lead artist, with selected chart positions and certifications
Title	Year	Chart positions									Certifications	Album
Title	Year	US	US Cash Box	US R&B /HH	US R&B Cash Box	US Dance	CAN AC	UK Dance	UK Disco	UK R&B	Certifications	Album
"Mercy, Mercy, Mercy"	1967	58	66	33	37	—	—	—	—	11		Non-album single
"It's Better Than Walkin' Out"	1976	103	—	74	83	—	—	—	—	—		Just a Matter of Time
"Pictures and Memories"	1977	—	—	—	—	24	—	—	—	—		Sweet Beginnings
"Yu-Ma/Go Away Little Boy"	1977	—	79	21	19	—	—	46	35	—		Sweet Beginnings
"Theme from Looking for Mr. Goodbar (Don't Ask to Stay Until Tomorrow)"	1978	—	—	—	—	—	45	—	—	—		Looking for Mr. Goodbar
"Love Dancin'"	1979	—	—	—	—	49	—	—	—	—		Take a Bite
"Never Give Up on You"	1983	—	—	91	—	48	—	—	—	—		Let Me in Your Life
"California Soul"	2004	—	—	—	—	—	—	—	—	—	BPI: Platinum	The Spice of Life
"—" denotes releases that did not chart or were not released in that territory.
