= Richard Elfman =

American film director (born 1949)

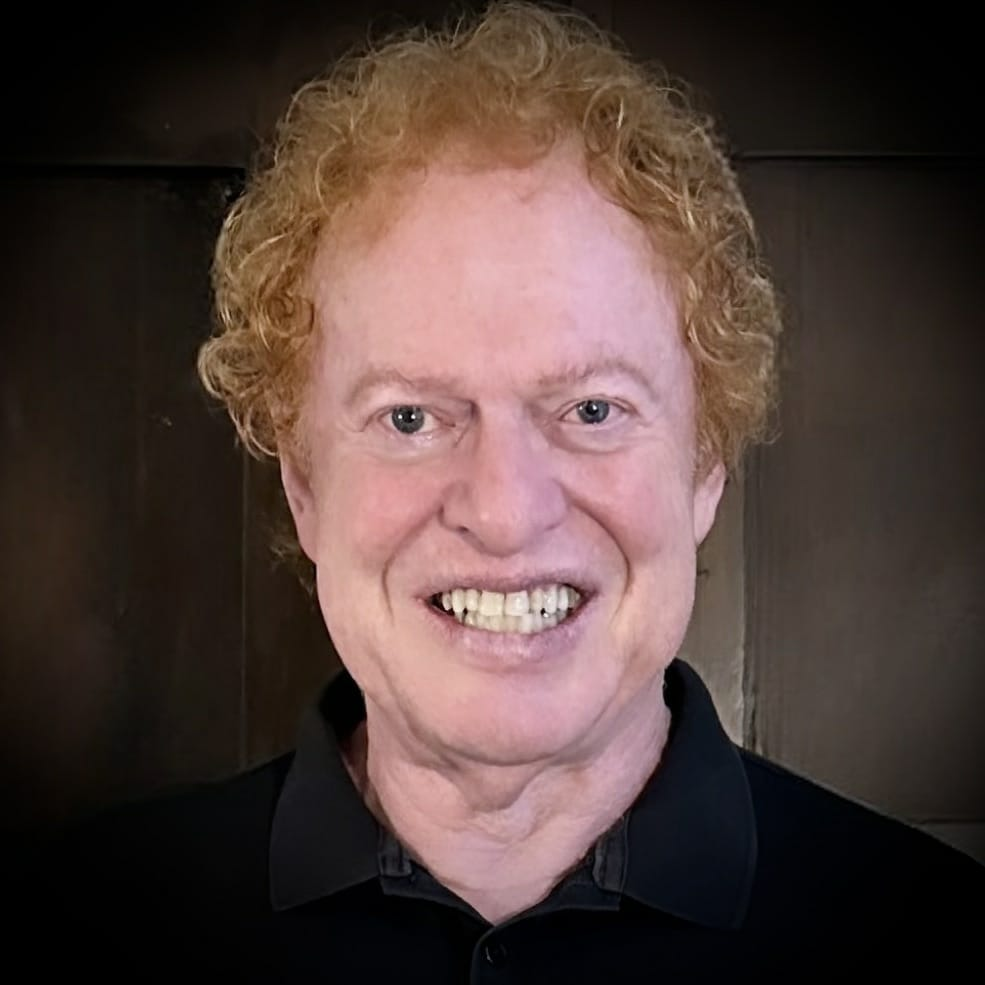
- Elfman in 2023
- Born: Watts, Los Angeles, California, U.S.
- Other names: Aristide Sumatra; Mahatma Kane Sumatra
- Occupations: Actor; director; producer; screenwriter; author; publisher; journalist; musician
- Years active: 1968–present
- Spouse(s): Marie-Pascale Elfman (1973–1987); Anastasia Elfman (2012–present)
- Children: 3, including Bodhi Elfman
- Mother: Blossom Elfman
- Relatives: Danny Elfman (brother), Jenna Elfman (daughter-in-law)
- Website: richardelfman.com

Richard Elfman is an American actor, musician, director, producer, screenwriter, journalist, author and magazine publisher.

== Early life ==
His younger brother is musician and film composer Danny Elfman, with whom Richard would found the Mystic Knights of the Oingo Boingo, a performance art troupe that would later morph into Oingo Boingo, an eclectic band that was popular in the 1980s and 1990s.

When Richard was four, his family moved to the Crenshaw district, where Elfman excelled as a track champion at Dorsey High School, subsequently becoming an amateur middleweight boxer. Elfman dropped out of college and opened clothing stores adjacent UC Santa Barbara and UC Berkeley. He moved to Paris in the early 1970s to perform in theater as well as to record music in London. Presently, Elfman lives in the Hollywood Hills.

== Career ==
=== Theatre ===
While in Paris, Elfman was a member of Jérôme Savary's musical theater company, Le Grand Magic Circus, which toured Europe extensively and performed the show Zartan for a year's run at the 800-seat Cité Internationale Universitaire de Paris. The company also performed at London's Roundhouse under the auspices of Savary's mentor, Peter Brook of the Royal Shakespeare Company. It was during the Magic Circus' summer tour that Richard's brother Danny received his first professional job as a violinist with the company, performing as an opening act alongside Richard on percussion.

Shortly after his stint with the Mystic Knights of the Oingo Boingo, Elfman acted in and directed a stage production of Igor Stravinsky's L'Histoire du soldat, which won a Los Angeles Drama Critics Circle Award for Best Production.

=== Music ===
In 1972, Elfman returned to Los Angeles and formed his own troupe, the Mystic Knights of the Oingo Boingo, where he served as its creative director and percussionist. Elfman retrospectively described the Mystic Knights as a "commedia dell'arte ensemble", featuring upwards of fifteen musicians playing as many as thirty instruments, performing only recreated pieces of music from the 1920s through the 1940s as well as avant-garde originals composed by Elfman's brother Danny. The Mystic Knights performed steadily throughout the 1970s and gained a following in Los Angeles, which helped lead to a 1976 appearance on The Gong Show, where the group won the first place prize, and an uncredited cameo in the 1977 film I Never Promised You a Rose Garden. Elfman left the Mystic Knights in 1979 to pursue a career in filmmaking, after which Danny assumed creative control of the band, eventually shortening the name to "Oingo Boingo" and transforming it into an 8-piece rock band, which found success throughout the 1980s and 1990s.

Elfman currently plays in the band Mambo Diabolico, a surrealist collaboration between Elfman and composer Ego Plum. Elfman had written a play that included musicians onstage who subsequently stayed together as a band. "Life imitates Art," remarked Elfman.

=== Film ===
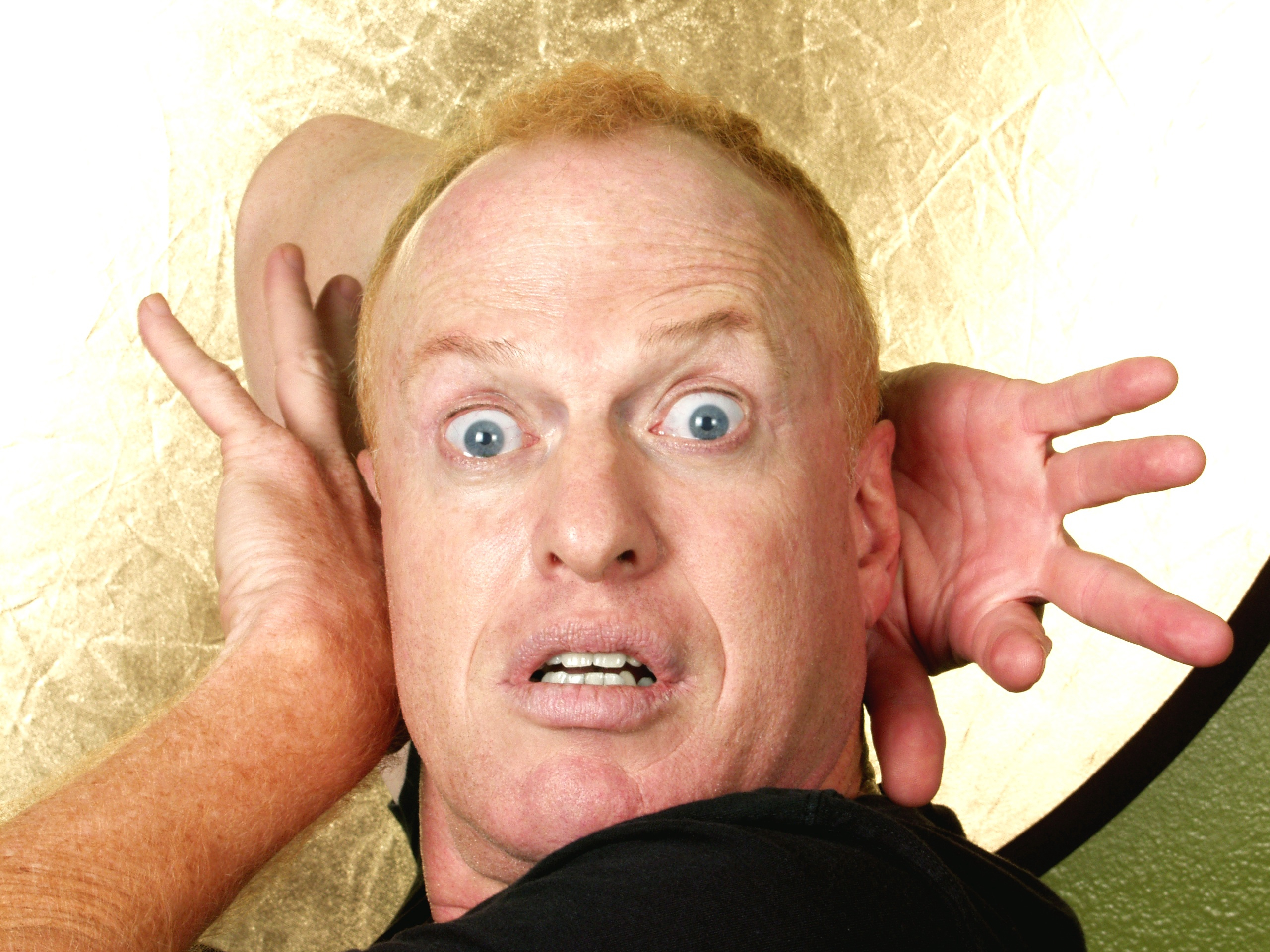
Elfman in 2003

Elfman's first directing project was the cult musical film Forbidden Zone, which was shot over a period of three years and released in 1982. The film itself was a surreal black and white film version of the Mystic Knights' theatrical show starring its band members and friends; notably, Danny Elfman appears onscreen as Satan, singing a modified version of Cab Calloway's "Minnie the Moocher", while Richard also appears, singing the 1920s song "The Yiddishe Charleston". In March 2010, Elfman premiered a colorized version of Forbidden Zone at New York's Museum of Modern Art in conjunction with a Tim Burton exhibition, while a stage musical adaptation, Forbidden Zone: Live in the 6th Dimension, ran at the Sacred Fools Theater Company in Los Angeles from May to June 2010.

Owing to its cult following, Forbidden Zone still screens in numerous cities and Elfman often performs in a live 20-minute pre-show composed of local artists, involving music, video clips and burlesque choreographed by Anastasia Elfman. Facilities allowing, Elfman, an accomplished grill-master, throws a barbecue after the show. More recently, theaters have also begun performing "shadow cast" screenings of Forbidden Zone similar to those made famous by The Rocky Horror Picture Show (1975), in which fans who are dressed in character perform in sync alongside the film. Elfman sometimes participates by playing characters in these live performances.

Elfman also directed the 1994 horror film Shrunken Heads for Full Moon Entertainment—footage and scenery of which was later reused for sequences in the 1996 Full Moon feature Zarkorr! The Invader—and the 1998 horror comedy Modern Vampires, both of which were written by Forbidden Zone writer and former Mystic Knights member Matthew Bright. In a 2009 interview, Elfman revealed he had also done various pseudonymous film work under the names "Aristide Sumatra" and "Mahatma Kane Sumatra", including the 1994 Mimi Lesseos martial arts film Streets of Rage.

Elfman wrote and directed a musical horror film, titled Bloody Bridget, in 2024.

=== Writing, publishing and mixed media ===
Elfman became a writer for Buzzine magazine, eventually becoming its film editor and then editor-in-chief.

His first novel, The Schlimazel of Sebreim, a vampire tale, was published by Encyclopocalypse Publications in 2023. Elfman has two more novels slated for publication in 2024.

Elfman is presently engaged to write and develop animation projects for FilmHenge and The Apiary group.

== Personal life ==
His family is Jewish. He is the father of three including Bodhi Elfman, who is married to Jenna Elfman. He was married to Marie Pascale-Elfman 1973-1987 and has been married to Anastasia Elfman since 2012.

== Filmography ==
=== As director ===
Year	Film	Notes
1980	Forbidden Zone	Also producer, co-writer and composer Not distributed until 1982
1981	"Little Girls"	Oingo Boingo music videos
1982	"Private Life"	Oingo Boingo music videos
1983	"Nothing Bad Ever Happens"	Oingo Boingo music videos
1994	Shrunken Heads	
1994	Streets of Rage	Also co-writer (as Aristide Sumatra)
1996	Bone Chillers	Four episodes of children's horror series
1998	Modern Vampires	Also co-producer
2003	Date or Disaster	Short film; also writer and producer
2008	28 Days to Vegas	Feature documentary; also producer
2009	30 Days to Vegas	Feature documentary; also producer (as Mahatma Kane Sumatra)
2019	Aliens, Clowns & Geeks	Intergalactic war between clowns and aliens
2020	Intro to Forbidden Zone: Director's Cut	
2024	Bloody Bridget	Musical comedy horror

=== As actor ===
Year	Film	Role	Notes
1977	I Never Promised You a Rose Garden	Drumming Demon	Appearing as member of the Mystic Knights of the Oingo Boingo
1980	Forbidden Zone	Masseuse/Prisoner	
1994	Shrunken Heads	Preacher on Bus	
1997	George of the Jungle	Bongo Drummer at Dance Studio	As Aristide Sumatra
1998	Modern Vampires	Cop with Doughnut	
2002	Scarecrow	Sheriff Patterson/Hewitt	As Aristide Sumatra
2003	Date or Disaster	Cop with Donut	
2004	Demons at the Door	Monkey Demon	As Aristide Sumatra
2012	The Geologist	The Geologist	Short film
2019	Aliens, Clowns & Geeks	Clown Bippy	
2020	Stupid Cupid	Patient	TV movie
2020	Sorority of the Damned	Reynold Harmony	Sorority house horror film
2022	The Once and Future Smash	Himself	Feature film mockumentary
