= Oingo Boingo =

American rock band (1979–1995)

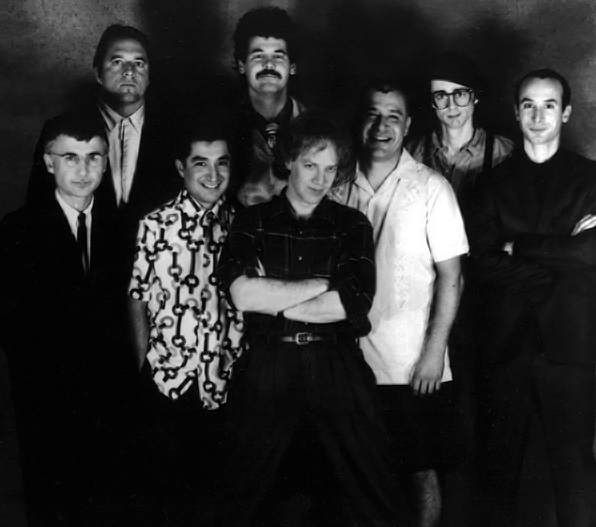
- Oingo Boingo in 1987. From left to right: Dale Turner, Sam "Sluggo" Phipps, John Avila, Steve Bartek, Danny Elfman, Johnny "Vatos" Hernandez, Mike Bacich, Leon Schneiderman.

Background information
- Also known as: Boingo; Clowns of Death; Mosley & The B-Men
- Origin: Los Angeles, California, U.S.
- Genres: New wave; ska; art rock
- Works: Discography
- Years active: 1979–1995
- Labels: I.R.S.; A&M; MCA; Giant
- Spinoff of: The Mystic Knights of the Oingo Boingo
- Past members: John Avila; Michael Bacich; Steve Bartek; Joe Berland; Danny Elfman; Warren Fitzgerald; Richard Gibbs; Carl Graves; Kerry Hatch; John "Vatos" Hernandez; Doug Lacy; Marc Mann; Sam "Sluggo" Phipps; Leon Schneiderman; Dan Schmidt; Dale Turner

Oingo Boingo (/ˈɔɪŋɡoʊ ˈbɔɪŋɡoʊ/) was an American rock band formed by songwriter Danny Elfman in 1979. The band emerged from a surrealist musical theatre troupe, the Mystic Knights of the Oingo Boingo, that Elfman had previously led and written material for.

Oingo Boingo was known for their high-energy live concerts and experimental music, which can be described as combining elements of music such as new wave, art, punk, ska, pop, jazz and world amongst other genres. The band's body of work spanned 17 years with various genre and line-up changes. Their best-known songs include "Only a Lad", "Little Girls", "Dead Man's Party" and "Weird Science", which is also their highest-charting song, reaching No. 45 on the US Billboard Hot 100.

The band experienced multiple line-up changes, with Elfman, Leon Schneiderman, Dale Turner, Sam Phipps, Steve Bartek and John "Vatos" Hernandez being the constant members for most of their history. Oingo Boingo started as a ska and punk-influenced new wave octet, achieving significant popularity in Southern California. During the mid-1980s, the band adopted a more pop-oriented style before delving further into rock in 1994. At that point, the name was shortened to simply Boingo and the keyboard and horn sections were dropped. The band retired after a farewell concert on Halloween 1995, for which they reverted to the name Oingo Boingo and readopted the horn section.

== History ==
=== The Mystic Knights of the Oingo Boingo (1972–1979) ===
The Mystic Knights of the Oingo Boingo began as a street theater troupe in Los Angeles, founded by Richard Elfman. The name was inspired by a fictional secret society on the Amos 'n' Andy TV series called The Mystic Knights of the Sea. The earliest version of the band employed as many as 15 performers at any given time, playing over 30 instruments, including some instruments built by band members.

Richard's brother Danny Elfman joined the band in 1974 and later became its leader. The group gradually moved away from its street theater origins and transformed into a dedicated musical theater act. The group performed an eclectic repertoire, ranging from Cab Calloway covers to instrumentals in the style of Balinese gamelan and Russian ballet music and, later, original songs by Danny Elfman. Guitarist Steve Bartek joined in 1976 as musical co-director. That year, the troupe appeared on the TV talent contest program The Gong Show, which they won.

=== I.R.S. and A&M years (1979–1984) ===
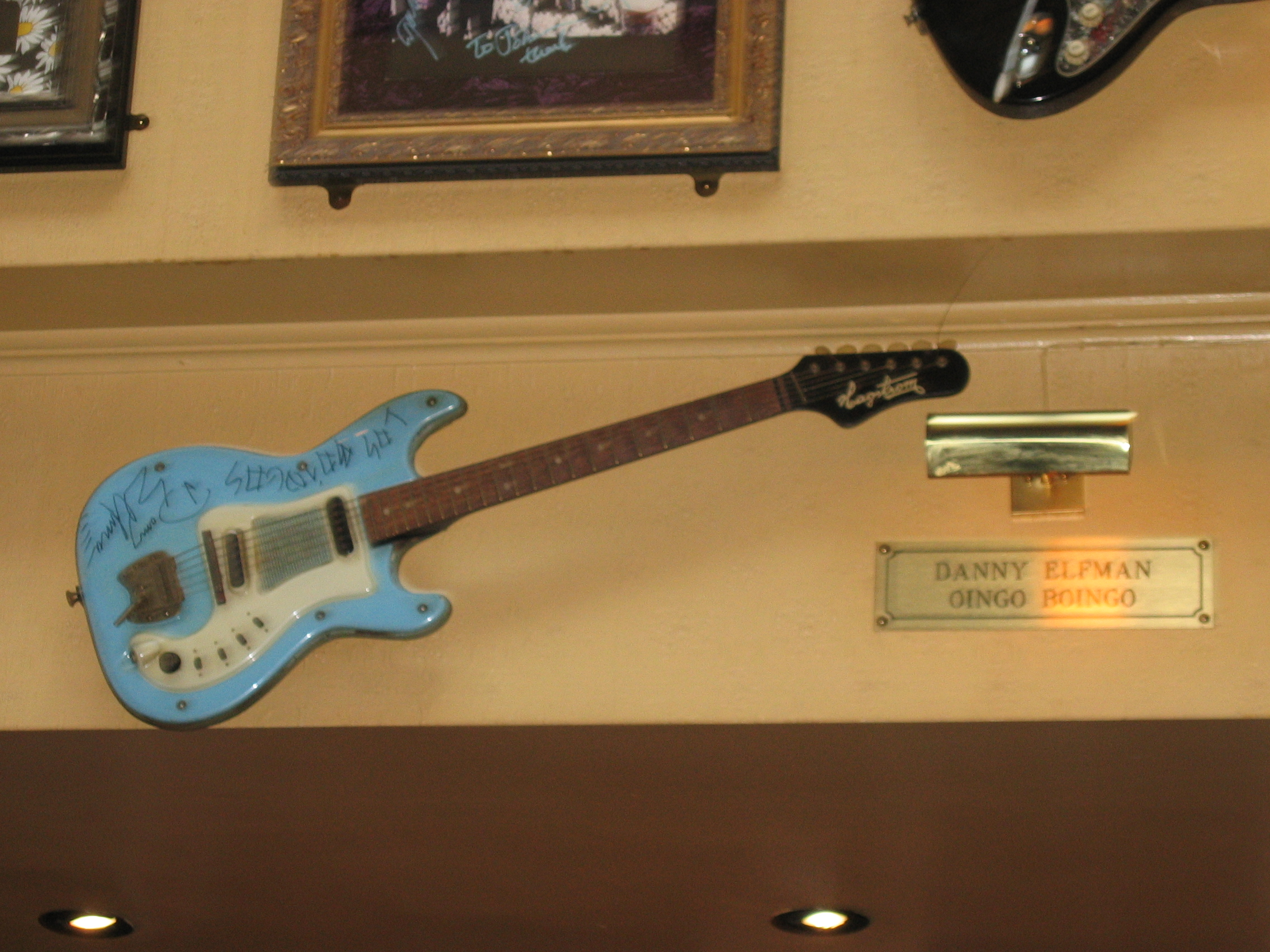
Guitar used by Danny Elfman in Oingo Boingo, Hard Rock Cafe Montreal

In 1979, Danny Elfman reformed the group as a dedicated rock band, under the new name Oingo Boingo, at which point most existing members left. Steve Bartek and a brass trio of Dale Turner, Sam "Sluggo" Phipps, and Leon Schneiderman continued with the new band. Various reasons were given for the restart as a rock band, notably Danny's emerging musical interests, and reducing the need for transportation and set-up of multiple stage sets and props. Elfman stated the shift was inspired by ska revival bands such as the Specials, Madness, and the Selecter, new wave bands like XTC, Devo, and Fun Boy Three, as well as the "energy and speed" of punk.

The name Oingo Boingo was settled on in 1979, at which point their early song "I'm Afraid" appeared on the Rhino Records Los Angeles rock and new wave "up and coming" compilation, L.A. In.

That same year, the band self-funded a promo EP record, known as the "Demo EP", for distribution to radio stations and recording industry A&R representatives to help land a contract. The record caught the attention of I.R.S. Records, who released a revised version of the EP as Oingo Boingo in 1980.

The band was now an octet with Danny Elfman on lead vocals and rhythm guitar; Steve Bartek on lead guitar; Richard Gibbs on keyboards; Kerry Hatch on bass; Johnny "Vatos" Hernandez on drums; and Leon Schneiderman, Sam "Sluggo" Phipps, and Dale Turner on horns. Early success for the group came in 1980 with the song "Only a Lad" from the eponymous EP. The song aired frequently in Los Angeles on KROQ-FM, and complemented the station's then-unusual new wave format.

Following regional success of "Only a Lad", the group signed to A&M Records. They released their first full-length album in 1981, also titled Only a Lad and featuring a new recording of the song. The band released further albums Nothing to Fear in 1982, and Good for Your Soul in 1983. Although the band's sound was termed as new wave, Oingo Boingo's use of exotic percussion, a three-piece horn section, unconventional scales and harmony, and surreal imagery was a genre-skewing combination.

The band performed at the US Festival twice. The first appearance was on September 3, 1982; the second was May 28, 1983.

=== MCA years (1984–1992) ===
Oingo Boingo logo, adopted around the late 1980s

In 1984, bassist Kerry Hatch and keyboardist Richard Gibbs departed to form the short-lived band Zuma II and the band went on a short hiatus. Around this time, the group's new manager Mike Gormley, who had recently left the position of VP of Publicity and Asst. to the Chairman of A&M, negotiated a release from the label and signed Danny Elfman to a solo deal with MCA Records.

That year, the soundtrack to the movie Bachelor Party included a theme song and an exclusive song, "Something Isn't Right", recorded by Oingo Boingo. The first album under MCA was So-Lo in late 1984, released as a Danny Elfman solo album, however all previous members of Oingo Boingo were credited as session musicians, together with Red Hot Chili Peppers bassist Flea.

Shortly after releasing So-Lo, Oingo Boingo returned to performing with new bassist John Avila and keyboardist Mike Bacich, and the MCA deal was revised to be a deal for the band rather than Elfman as a solo act. The first release with the new Oingo Boingo line-up was Dead Man's Party in 1985. The album marked a notable change towards more pop oriented songwriting and production style, and became the band's most commercially successful record. It featured their highest-charting song on the Billboard Hot 100, "Weird Science", which was written for the John Hughes film of the same name.

The band appeared on a number of movie soundtracks in the early to mid-1980s, including an appearance in the movie Back to School in 1986, performing their hit single "Dead Man's Party".

During this era, Danny Elfman also began scoring major films, beginning with 1985's Pee-wee's Big Adventure. Elfman would go on to write the scores to almost all of Tim Burton's films. Oingo Boingo guitarist Steve Bartek has orchestrated most of Elfman's film and television scores.

The album BOI-NGO was released in 1987. Following its recording, Bacich was replaced by new keyboardist Carl Graves. The band's 1988 release, Boingo Alive, comprised "live" re-recordings of previous album songs on a studio soundstage, plus a new song, "Winning Side". This new track was also released as a single, and became a No. 14 hit on US Modern Rock radio stations.

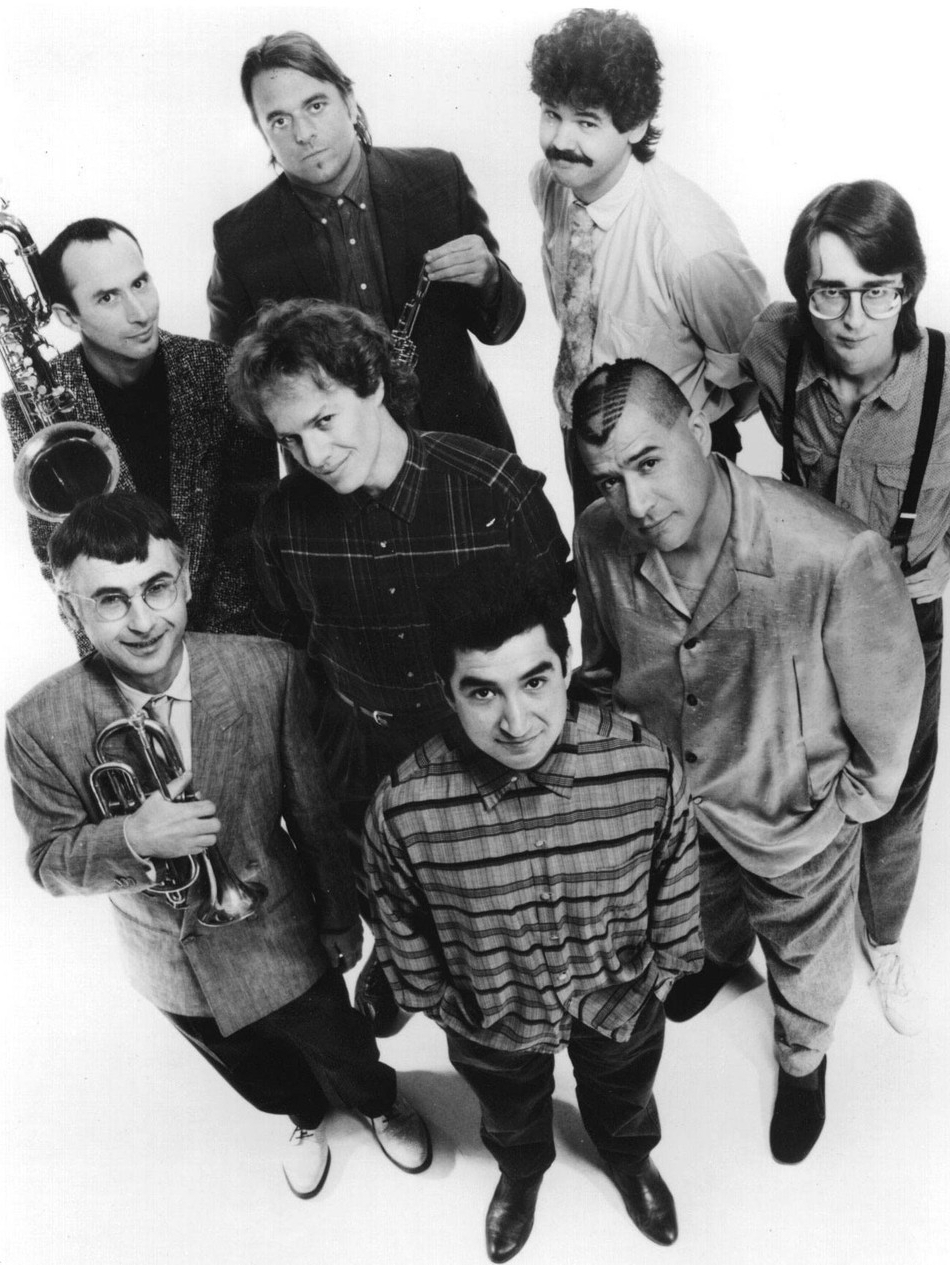
Oingo Boingo in a promotional picture c.1987

In 1990, the band released their seventh studio album, Dark at the End of the Tunnel, featuring more mellow songs than any previous release, and including the singles "Out of Control" and "Flesh 'N Blood".

=== Final years (1993–1995) ===
Oingo Boingo continued to regularly perform live, most notably with annual Halloween concerts at Irvine Meadows and the Universal Amphitheatre. Following a short hiatus in 1992, during which time Elfman was busy scoring films, the band returned in 1993 with an increasingly different, hard-rock musical direction, and debuted new material such as "Insanity", "Helpless" and the unreleased song "Did It There". Shows during these years often included the so-called "Sad Clown Orchestra" providing additional accordion and circus percussion.

That same year, Oingo Boingo began recording an eighth studio album for new label Giant Records. The sessions stalled when Elfman became heavily involved writing the music for animated musical The Nightmare Before Christmas with Tim Burton. Of this period, Elfman would later reflect that, after over 15 years, he had begun losing his passion for the band.

In 1994, the band consolidated their new musical style, and shortened its name to Boingo. Guitarist Warren Fitzgerald joined while keyboardist Carl Graves and the horn trio were removed. This marked the only year that the band toured without the horn section.

The previously shelved album was completed with the new 5-piece line-up, including orchestral instrumentation, and several songs improvised in the studio for the first time in the band's history. This was released as Boingo in 1994, and would be the band's final studio album.

In 1995, it was announced that Boingo would be disbanding after 17 years. The band embarked on a farewell tour in 1995, restoring the original horn trio, and reverting its name to Oingo Boingo, ending with a final Halloween performance at the Universal Amphitheatre. The concert was filmed and released on both VHS and CD in 1996 as Farewell.

=== Post-breakup ===
Following the band's dissolution, Danny Elfman continued composing for film and has been nominated for four Academy Awards for his work. He has scored the majority of Tim Burton's films since Pee-wee's Big Adventure in 1985, including Batman (1989), Edward Scissorhands (1990), The Nightmare Before Christmas (1993) and Big Fish (2003). Other scores include Good Will Hunting (1997), Men in Black (1997) and Spider-Man (2002). Elfman has also written themes for more than a dozen TV series, including The Simpsons, Batman: The Animated Series, Tales from the Crypt, and Desperate Housewives. Elfman almost exclusively employs former Oingo Boingo guitarist Steve Bartek as his orchestrator.

For a period, John Avila and Johnny "Vatos" Hernandez continued to perform as Food for Feet and in the band Tito & Tarantula in Los Angeles. Doug Lacy (Boingo live keyboardist and percussionist) recruited bassist John Avila, guitarist Steve Bartek, drummer Johnny "Vatos" Hernandez, and saxophonist Sam Phipps (among other musicians) for a band called Doug & The Mystics. They recorded one album, New Hat, which included a cover of the Oingo Boingo song "Try to Believe". Former keyboardist Richard Gibbs also began a career as a composer for film.

Danny Elfman has regularly stated that there will not be an Oingo Boingo reunion, initially citing his worry that playing live would exacerbate his hearing loss. In 2021 Elfman added that he disliked former bands reuniting now that they are older, likening them to "zombies".

On Halloween 2015, a live concert performance of The Nightmare Before Christmas culminated in Elfman and former Oingo Boingo guitarist Steve Bartek performing "Dead Man's Party" for the first time in twenty years, accompanied by the orchestra. The song was again performed on several subsequent Nightmare Before Christmas concert dates.

In April 2016, Oingo Boingo were honored with a resolution at Los Angeles City Hall. Popular L.A. radio and television personality Richard Blade gave a speech about the band's legacy. Several members attended the meeting from across the band's changing line-ups, including Johnny "Vatos" Hernandez, founding keyboardist Richard Gibbs, John Avila, Carl Graves, and Sam "Sluggo" Phipps.

On June 11, 2021, Elfman released his first solo studio album in 37 years, Big Mess. It includes the participation of former members of Oingo Boingo, such as Bartek, Fitzgerald, and Mann and a new arrangement and recording of Oingo Boingo's "Insects" from the 1982 album Nothing to Fear.

==== Tribute band ====
Since Halloween 2005, former drummer Johnny "Vatos" Hernandez has regularly put together an Oingo Boingo tribute band, performing mainly throughout Southern California and Arizona, including the Grove of Anaheim. Initially billed as the "Johnny 'Vatos' Tribute to Halloween, Featuring Former Members of Oingo Boingo", Hernandez later titled the band "Johnny Vatos Oingo Boingo Dance Party" and then "Oingo Boingo Former Members". Since 2015, Elfman has endorsed the group as the authorized Oingo Boingo tribute band, and given Hernandez exclusive rights to use the names 'Boingo' and 'Oingo Boingo'.

The tribute band is joined intermittently by former Oingo Boingo members such as Steve Bartek, Carl Graves, John Avila, and Sam "Sluggo" Phipps. Lead vocals were performed by singer Brendan McCreary, until being replaced by Jose Maldonado in 2025.

== Members ==
Key members

- Danny Elfman – lead vocals, rhythm guitars (1979–1995)
- Steve Bartek – lead guitars, background vocals (1979–1995)
- John Avila – bass, background vocals (1984–1995)
- Warren Fitzgerald – guitars, background vocals (1993–1995)
- Johnny "Vatos" Hernandez – drums, percussion (1979–1980; 1980–1995)
- Leon Schneiderman – baritone and alto saxophones (1979–1993; 1995)
- Dale Turner – trumpet, trombones, background vocals (1979–1993; 1995)
- Sam "Sluggo" Phipps – tenor and soprano saxophones (1979–1993; 1995)

Additional members (Note: As credited on the 1994 Boingo album and 1995 Farewell live album.)

- Marc Mann – keyboards, samples (1993–1995)
- Doug Lacy – accordion, percussion, trombone (1993–1995)

Former key members

- Dan Schmidt – keyboards, synthesizers (1979–1980)
- Kerry Hatch – bass, percussion, background vocals (1979–1984)
- Richard Gibbs – keyboards, synthesizers, trombones, background vocals (1980–1984)
- David Eagle – drums, percussion (1980)
- Michael Bacich – keyboards, background vocals (1984–1987)
- Carl Graves – keyboards, synthesizers, percussion, background vocals (1987–1993)

== Discography ==
- Only a Lad (1981)
- Nothing to Fear (1982)
- Good for Your Soul (1983)
- So-Lo (1984) (as Danny Elfman)
- Dead Man's Party (1985)
- Boi-ngo (1987)
- Dark at the End of the Tunnel (1990)
- Boingo (1994) (as Boingo)

== Filmography ==
Appearing on screen as Oingo Boingo

- Longshot (1981)
- Forbidden Zone (1980)
- Urgh! A Music War (1981)
- Good Morning, Mr. Orwell (1984)
- Back to School (1986)
- The Best of Oingo Boingo: Skeletons in the Closet (1989; music video compilation)
- Farewell: Live from the Universal Amphitheatre, Halloween 1995
