= Radioactive Chicken Heads =

American virtual band

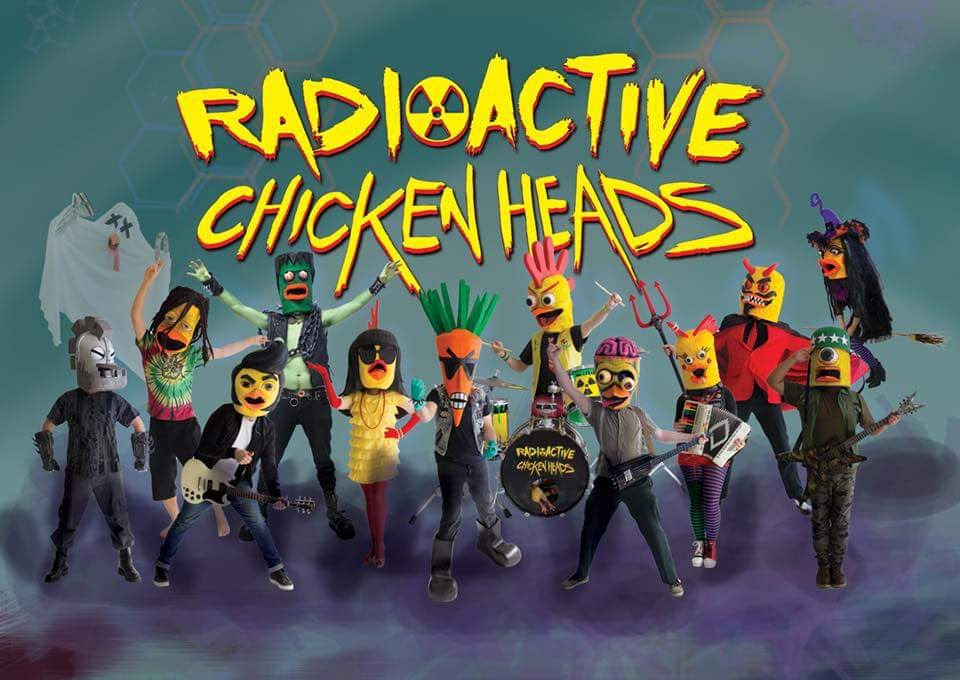
- The Radioactive Chicken Heads' cast of characters as of 2017's Tales From The Coop

Background information
- Also known as: Joe and the Chicken Heads (1993–2004)
- Origin: Orange, California, U.S.
- Genres: Punk rock; comedy punk; ska punk; geek rock; heavy metal; horror punk
- Years active: 1993–present
- Labels: Snail Sounds, Superpickle, Cluckin Records
- Website: radioactivechickenheads.com

The Radioactive Chicken Heads are an American punk band formed in Orange, California in 1993.

Operating anonymously under the guise of mutant chickens and vegetables, the Chicken Heads' music is primarily a mix of punk rock, heavy metal, and ska punk, a blend the band advertises as "Genetically Modified Punk Rock".

Originally formed under the name Joe and the Chicken Heads, the Chicken Heads first established a cult following within the Orange County punk and ska scene for their over-the-top theatrical stage shows utilizing a wide variety of props and costumed characters, all of which tie into an elaborate fictional mythology which serves as the basis for many of the band's songs and videos. Following their name change in 2004, the Chicken Heads have since focused more on multi-media projects centered on this mythology, including music videos, concept albums, YouTube skits, stage plays, a role-playing computer game and an independently produced television pilot.

To date, the band has released three studio albums and one compilation under the name "Radioactive Chicken Heads", with one studio album, one EP and six self-produced demo cassettes released during their time as "Joe and the Chicken Heads". Their most recent album, Tales From The Coop, was released in October 2017.

== History ==
=== Joe and the Chicken Heads (1993–2004) ===
Joe and the Chicken Heads (1998)

In a rare out-of-character interview, lead singer Carrot Topp explained that the genesis of the Radioactive Chicken Heads began with two comic books he had written as a teenager. One comic was about a gang of mutant vegetables called The Vegamatics; the other, called "Joe and the Chicken Heads" centred around a kid named Joe who sings with a rock band made up of headless chickens. After discovering the comedy metal band Green Jellÿ, a group renowned for their use of puppets and costumes, Carrot Topp ultimately decided to apply these concepts and visuals to a rock band combining elements of both comic books, creating the band's distinctive masks and props himself.

Joe and the Chicken Heads were officially formed in late 1993, though the band didn't play their first show until February 26, 1994, at a Bar Mitzvah in Orange, California. Despite recording several demo tapes and appearing on numerous local compilations during the mid-1990s, the Chicken Heads performed few live shows until the arrival of the late 1990s ska revival helped the band attract a wider following within the Orange County's booming ska and punk scene, sharing the stage with such notable ska acts as Link 80, Slow Gherkin and Bim Skala Bim and receiving regular airplay on KUCI's influential Ska Parade radio show, which hosted many up and coming local ska and punk bands. The band's outrageous costumes and live shows soon began attracting publicity both positive and negative from local papers and zines including OC Weekly, LA Weekly, The Daily Trojan, X-TRA and Maximumrocknroll, with Thrasher magazine inexplicably describing them as "more fun than a shopping spree in a Mexican supermarket".

In late 1997, following a staged altercation with The Aquabats, the Chicken Heads waged a mock rivalry against the costumed superhero-themed band, a feud which was even covered in the OC Weekly newspaper at a time when both bands were experiencing notable local popularity. Though this rivalry never reached its fruition onstage, the Chicken Heads received a jokingly disparaging reference on the Ska Parade's infamous "Gwar vs. The Aquabats" radio skit the same year, wherein Aquabats lead singer The MC Bat Commander, turning down an offer to save the world because his band won't get paid, remarks "with that kind of motivation, you can probably get Joe and the Chicken Heads".

In 1998, the Chicken Heads made their national television debut playing the song "Pest Control" on a Halloween-themed episode of Extreme Gong, a short-lived revival of the 1970s Gong Show game show which aired on the Game Show Network. Although the band was "gonged" mid-performance, signifying that the call-in voters disapproved of their act and wanted them to stop, the Chicken Heads finished their song anyway, claiming that they were playing so loud that they couldn't hear the gong.

Joe and the Chicken Heads independently released their first and only album Keep on Cluckin' in May 2000, featuring 26 songs which had been recorded over the span of three years. In wake of the album's release, the Chicken Heads began playing shows with much more frequency, forming a touring relationship with their original inspirations Green Jellÿ while also sharing bills with punk bands including the Angry Samoans, D.I., Litmus Green and The Briefs. In May 2002, the band released their final work as Joe and the Chicken Heads, a five-track mini CD single entitled Family Album.

=== The Radioactive Chicken Heads (2004–present) ===
==== Growing Mold and early activity (2004–2007) ====
After a period of time performing as "The Rock N' Roll Chicken Heads" and "The Chicken Heads", Joe and the Chicken Heads permanently changed their name to "The Radioactive Chicken Heads" in mid-2004. According to their website, the "official" tongue-in-cheek reason behind the name change was due to "new government regulations which require all radioactive farm products to be labeled clearly".

The Radioactive Chicken Heads self-released their first album under their new name, Growing Mold, in March 2005. Mixed, engineered and featuring instrumental contributions by avant-garde composer Ego Plum, Growing Mold eschewed the skacore influence of the band's early work in favor of exploring more eclectic and experimental musical territory, resulting in a combination of sounds (un)Leash magazine described as "like early Mystic Knights of the Oingo Boingo meets Dead Kennedys meets gothabilly monster mash". While Growing Mold never reached the radar of any major music publications, the album was praised by local university papers and alternative weeklies, with UC Riverside's Highlander dubbing the Chicken Heads "one of the best bands you've probably never heard of" and OC Weekly calling the album "funny" and "amusingly campy", while the single "I Eat Kids", a cover of a Barry Louis Polisar song, was selected for airplay on the nationally syndicated Dr. Demento Show.

In November 2006, the Chicken Heads made another brief appearance on national television when they were invited to perform on an episode of The Tyra Banks Show as part of an America's Got Talent spoof called "Tyra's Got Talent", which featured weird and unusual talent acts. According to Carrot Topp, the Chicken Heads were actually a last minute replacement for another act, an Elvis impersonator in a chicken suit called "Elvis Poultry", who couldn't make the shoot. The band performed the song "Our Last Song" before a mostly confused studio audience, ultimately losing out to John the Running Painter, a painter on a treadmill, by an audience vote of 73% to 27%.

==== Music for Mutants, Poultry Uprising and national touring (2008–2017) ====
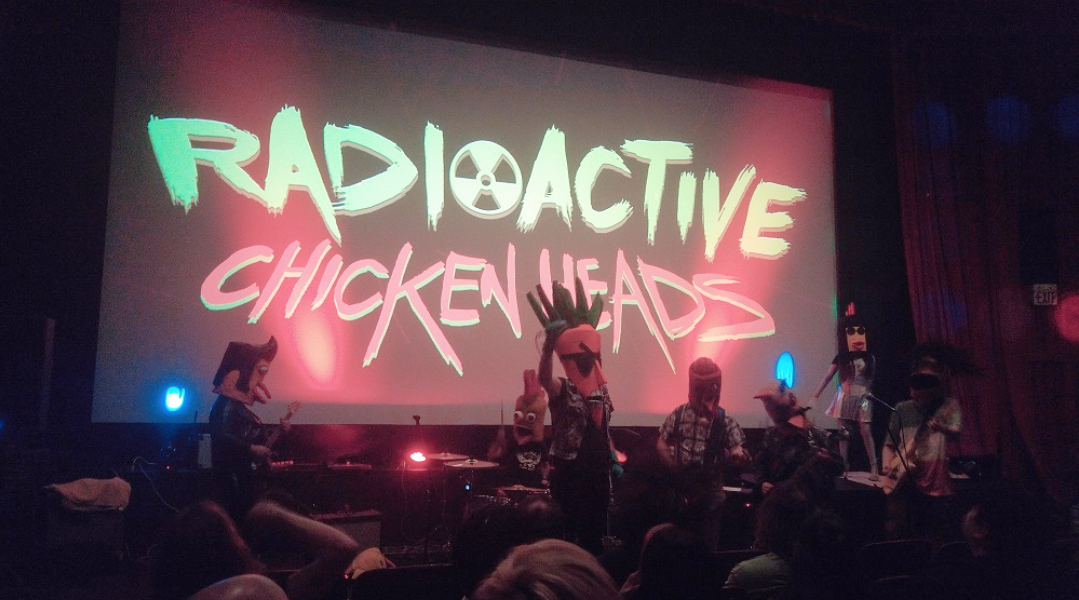
The Chicken Heads playing in Santa Ana in April 2016

Following further local touring within Southern California's club circuit, the Chicken Heads self-released their third album Music for Mutants in the summer of 2008, finding the band returning to a more aggressive punk rock sound. In promotion of the album, the Chicken Heads embarked on their first national tour supporting Green Jellÿ and hard rock band Rosemary's Billygoat on what was called the "Hollywood Freak Show", a tour spanning nearly sixty shows in thirty states. During this tour, all three bands toured as the same amalgamated line-up of musicians, virtually changing only the costumes and lead singers between sets.

Around this time, the Chicken Heads began focusing on producing music videos showcasing the band's prop work and theatricality. Between 2007 and 2010, four music videos were independently filmed for the songs "I Looked Into the Mirror", "Pest Control", "Badd Bunny" and "I Eat Kids", each one heavily featuring elaborate puppetry, costuming and cartoonish set design. This period also found the Chicken Heads receiving new exposure in low-budget horror films, recording on Count Smokula's song "Poultrygeist" for the soundtrack to the 2008 Troma Entertainment production Poultrygeist: Night of the Chicken Dead and writing the theme song to the horror comedy Atom the Amazing Zombie Killer, which featured stop-motion animated cameos from the band members during the film's opening credits sequence.

In 2009, the Chicken Heads released Poultry Uprising, a 14-song collection of older material recorded from their time as Joe and the Chicken Heads. The same year, lead singer Carrot Topp produced a compilation album on the Chicken Heads' own label Snail Sounds Records entitled We're Not Kidding!, a tribute to children's musician Barry Louis Polisar, featuring sixty artists including The Vespers, DeLeon, Rebecca Loebe, Tor Hyams, In the Audience and a duet between Polisar and the Chicken Heads. We're Not Kidding! received high praise from children's publications, winning the 2010 Parents' Choice Award.

The Chicken Heads launched an Indiegogo campaign in November 2011 to help fund production on both a 15-minute prospective television pilot based on the band's fictional exploits and the release of a DVD including music videos and a live concert performance filmed in 2008. Although the campaign ultimately failed to meet its funding goal, the band continued work on numerous projects over the next two years, filming seven more music videos for both the band's original songs, including "Deviled Egg", directed by Hollywood special effects artist Jim Ojala, which was highlighted on horror channel Fearnet as their "Music Video of the Week", and humorous punk rock covers of popular songs, most notably the Imagine Dragons Grammy Award-winning song "Radioactive", which was released as a single. In July 2013, the Chicken Heads self-released Badd Bunny Breakout, a comedic RPG computer game based on the band's characters and mythology and featuring a soundtrack of 16-bit remixes of the group's songs.

The Chicken Heads appeared once again on national television in 2012 when they were featured on a segment of the TLC reality show My Crazy Obsession which focused on Zizi Howell, a woman obsessed with carrots. Howell was filmed going to a Chicken Heads concert at a Freak Show Wrestling event in Las Vegas, where she joined the band onstage and conducted a brief interview with Carrot Topp.

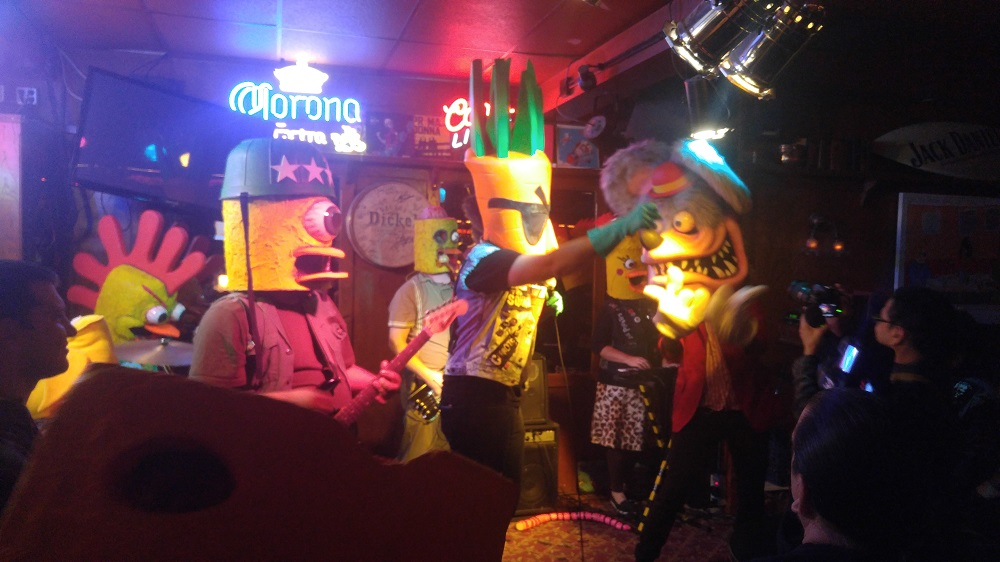
The Chicken Heads performing in Tarzana, California in November 2016

In December 2014, the Chicken Heads released a parody cover of Elvis Presley's "Burning Love", re-written as the Hanukkah-themed "Burning Latke". Heeb, a satirical Jewish magazine, singled it out as one of the "Worst Hanukkah Videos Of 2014", criticizing the "too obvious" parody lyrics but nevertheless praising the rest of the Chicken Heads' work as "genuinely fun". The Chicken Heads spent most of 2015 touring sporadically, including a three-show engagement in Lima, Peru in May. The band received further international attention when Polish radio network Antyradio ranked the Chicken Heads #18 on their list of the "Top 20 Rock and Metal Freaks", a list of costumed and theatrical rock bands, and in 2014 OC Weekly ranked them ninth on their list of the top ten horror punk bands. In 2014 and 2015, the band appeared on KNBC's 1st Look and KABC-TV's Eye on LA, respectively, on local interest shows highlighting the California Institute of Abnormalarts, both of which featured the Chicken Heads performing on the venue's stage in specially-recorded segments.

On March 28, 2015, The Steve Allen Theater hosted The Radioactive Chicken Heads Tanksgiving Special, a surrealist three-act comedy play featuring the music of and live accompaniment by the Chicken Heads, written and directed by composer and frequent Chicken Heads collaborator Ego Plum. Set in a dystopian alternate history where Colonel Sanders is depicted as an imperialist dictator presiding over a land where rock music is outlawed, the play follows a quartet of Chicken Head puppets who discover and subsequently learn to play rock and roll music in an attempt to overthrow Sanders' regime. In addition to the Chicken Heads, the play's cast included Gwar's Hunter Jackson (as his Techno Destructo persona), Haunted Garage's Dukey Flyswatter and Mike Odd of Rosemary's Billygoat and Mac Sabbath in speaking roles.

==== Tales From The Coop and current activity (2017–present) ====
On August 14, 2017, the Chicken Heads appeared on the ABC revival of The Gong Show, marking the band's second appearance on a Gong Show incarnation following 1998's Extreme Gong. The band performed a cover of The Trashmen's 1963 hit "Surfin' Bird", but were gonged after 41 seconds by guest judge Jack Black. The same day, the Chicken Heads released a music video of their recording of "Surfin' Bird" to YouTube.

After several years in production, the Chicken Heads independently released their fourth album Tales From The Coop on October 13, 2017. Produced by the Chicken Heads, Dave Klein, Jeff Forrest and Star Mendoza, Tales From The Coop takes the form of a concept album centered on the band's fictional backstory and menagerie of villains, featuring musical guest appearances from Klein, Dukey Flyswatter, Dominique Lenore Persi, Count Smokula and Ronald Osbourne, as well as a songwriting co-credit by Sleepy Brown of Organized Noize.

== Musical style and influences ==
Over the last 30 years, the Chicken Heads have featured an erratic and frequently rotating line-up of musicians and instrumentalists, and have performed with from four to twelve musicians at a time over the course of their career. The band has sometimes included upwards of three guitarists on stage and often utilize a keyboardist and/or an accordionist, while their horn section, when present, has ranged from a three-piece ensemble of trumpet, trombone and saxophone to a single trumpet. At one point from 1997 to 1998, the band even included a violinist and a clarinetist as part of their stage show. As of 2017, the band maintains a steadier line-up of between six and eight musicians, typically featuring a percussionist and keyboardist, along with an additional one or two members on costume accompaniment.

Originally inspired by comedy metal bands Green Jellÿ and Gwar, the Chicken Heads' first incarnation as Joe and the Chicken Heads produced their most abrasive material, boasting a sound predominantly grounded in heavy metal and hardcore and mixed with elements of ska punk and funk rock. Contemporary reviews of the band's shows drew comparisons such as "Fishbone meets GWAR" or "GWAR meets The Aquabats", while some reviewers coined unique terms like "doom ska" and "chicken-doom-ska-rock" to describe their mix of styles.

Following their name change to The Radioactive Chicken Heads, the band began transitioning into a less thrashy and more melodic style of punk rock, emphasizing an offbeat eclectic edge inspired by the likes of The Residents and Oingo Boingo, while also expanding their sound into occasional one-off genre experiments in styles ranging from reggae to rockabilly. The Chicken Heads' 2005 album Growing Mold featured a mix of punk, rock and blues songs interspersed with accordion and marimba-driven instrumentals, while their 2008 follow-up Music for Mutants returned to an entirely punk, rock and metal-oriented sound although with an increased use of keyboards and brass instruments. The OC Weekly has described the band's current style as a cross "between GWAR and The B-52s...a sound that might work well scoring a John Waters, Ed Wood or Russ Meyer film", while Loudwire summarized them as "the Dead Kennedys on acid".

Lyrically, the Chicken Heads have cited song parodist "Weird Al" Yankovic and children's musician Barry Louis Polisar as primary influences, and incorporate a similar style of puns and absurdist humor into their songwriting. Many of the band's songs center around their fictional backstory as mutant chickens, sometimes focusing on specific band members and stage villains, or references to bird-related popular culture such as "Headless Mike", an ode to the 1940s carnival attraction Mike the Headless Chicken. During their "Joe" era, the band performed many parody versions of popular punk rock songs, including "Put the Cheese Away (Keep It Refrigerated)", a spoof of The Offspring's "Come Out and Play (Keep 'Em Separated)", and "Just for the Taste of It", which repurposed Rancid's "Salvation" into a commercial jingle for Diet Coke.

== Band mythology ==
Having initially originated as a comic book concept, The Radioactive Chicken Heads have maintained an elaborate fictional narrative regarding the origins and universe of their characters, detailed and expanded upon through their official press biographies, in-character interviews, song lyrics, music videos, video game and television pilot.

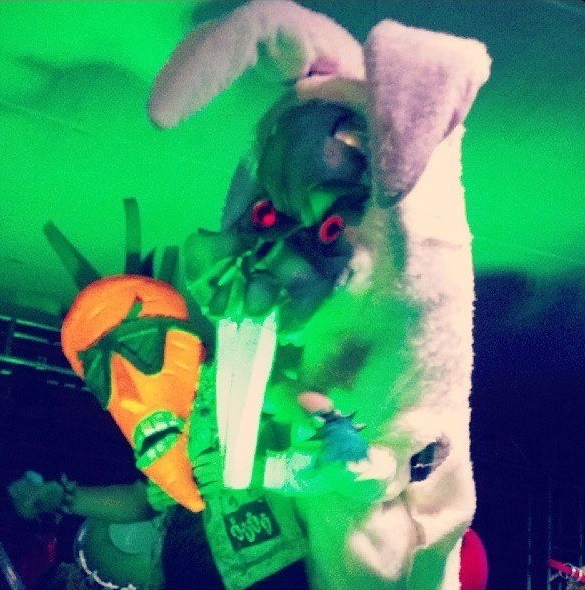
Carrot Topp being attacked by Badd Bunny at the 2013 Long Beach Zombie Walk

The Chicken Heads' origin stories can be separated into two distinct eras, delineated by the band's name change from "Joe and the Chicken Heads" into "The Radioactive Chicken Heads". As "Joe and the Chicken Heads", the group's story began on Uncle Max's farm, an otherwise normal California farm located underneath a series of high-tension electromagnetic power lines and regularly subject to government-led experiments in genetic engineering which produced massively-sized sentient vegetables, among which was the seven-foot tall carrot, Carrot Topp. Finding themselves bored with farm life, Carrot Topp and the other mutant vegetables started a punk rock band called The Vegematics, an endeavor which soon ended in tragedy when Badd Bunny, a rabbit mutated into an evil ten-ton beast by the same radiation, broke into their rehearsal space and devoured most of the members.

The following Spring, Badd Bunny sabotaged Uncle Max's annual Easter egg hunt by beating up the Easter Bunny and planting dozens of "genetically modified super-sized-mega-jumbo eggs" around the farm, hatching an army of gigantic mutant chickens. Max's nephew, a slightly unbalanced farmhand named Joe, saw a lucrative business opportunity and taught each of the chicken beasts how to play instruments, eventually debuting on the county fair circuit as the nation's premiere man/chicken musical combo: "Joe and the Chicken Heads". Ultimately, the rising tensions of "artistic differences" within the band drove Joe to behead his bandmates and sell their meaty bodies to an unnamed "Colonel", leaving Carrot Topp to save his poultry pals by taking their heads and sewing them onto an assortment of human bodies he collected from the dumpster behind the local cryogenics lab, starting a whole new band bent on rock and roll stardom.

Although elements of the Chicken Heads' original origin story served as the basis for the 2013 video game Badd Bunny Breakout, the band's official backstory was almost entirely retconned following their name change to "The Radioactive Chicken Heads" in 2004, completely removing the character of Joe and the setting of Uncle Max's farm. As most thoroughly detailed in Tales From The Coop and "The Radioactive Chicken Heads Show", Carrot Topp and the Chicken Heads are instead presented as the accidental creations of Dr. Baron Von Kluckinstein, a maniacal mad scientist conducting experiments on vegetables and poultry to make super-sized "frankenfoods". Kept as prisoners in his secret laboratory, the Chicken Heads eventually break out to live freely as a vegetable/poultry punk band, all the while fighting off Dr. Kluckinstein's sizable menagerie of monsters and creatures ordered to bring them back to captivity.

=== Live shows ===
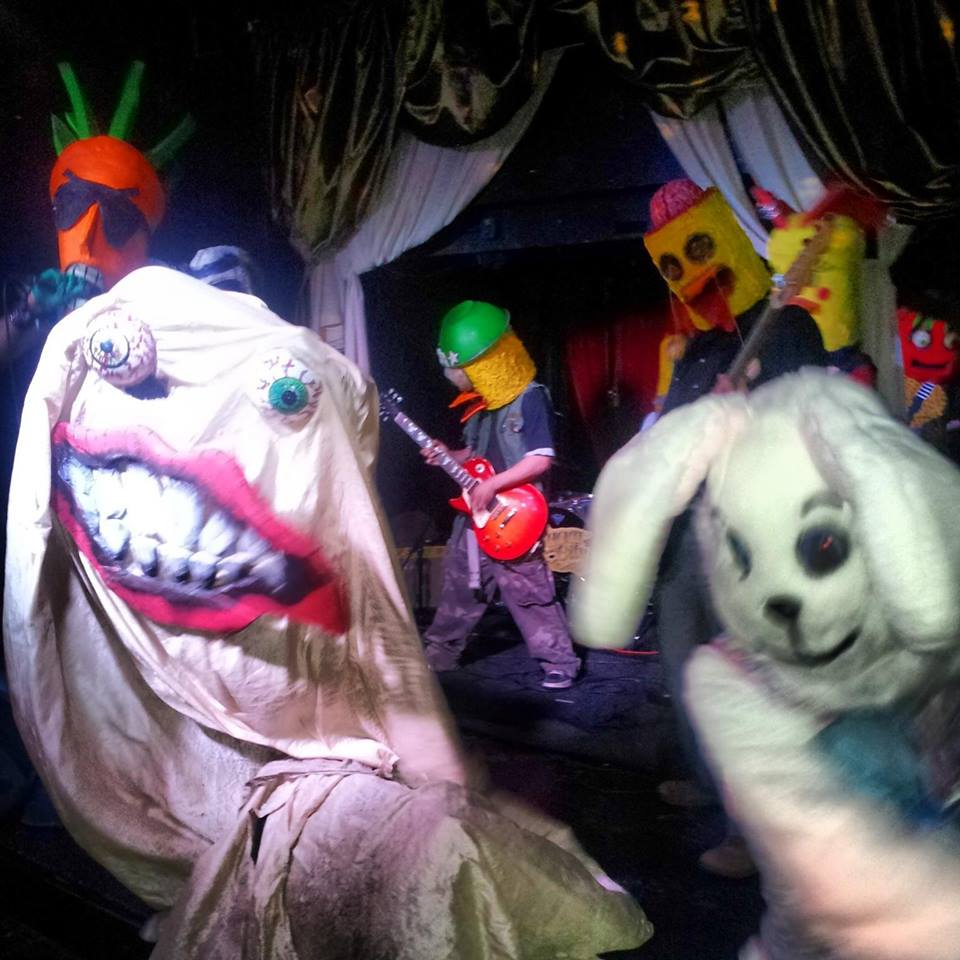
A typical collection of oddities at a Chicken Heads show in Los Angeles in March 2013

In a similar vein to other bands with fictionalized personas like Gwar and The Aquabats, the Chicken Heads are known for staging wild, theatrical live shows utilizing various props and costumed characters tying loosely into their thematic aesthetic. Due to the band members' attempt to retain anonymity, the Chicken Heads are rarely seen without their trademark masks and costumes and never grant interviews outside of their character personas, and thus always perform in full costume; although Carrot Topp sings while holding a dynamic microphone, a wireless headset microphone is used on the inside of his mask to provide voice clarity.

Every Chicken Heads show regularly features a host of extraneous characters outside of the main musicians, including both non-musician members who dance and interact with the audience during the band's set and "villains" who appear onstage to engage Carrot Topp in staged combat. These villains are mostly specific to the songs being played by the band, such as Badd Bunny and Liquid Fat appearing during their respective eponymous songs or "Chucky Cheeze" for "Pest Control", or thematically match the subject of the song, such as "Evil Carrot", a skeletal version of Carrot Topp, who appears during the song "I Looked Into the Mirror".

In addition to traditional music venues and festivals, the Chicken Heads have also performed within a wide variety of unconventional events and settings. Most notably, the band have been featured musical guests at Sinn Bodhi's Freakshow Wrestling throughout California and Nevada, as well as musical lead-ins for the award-winning Los Angeles production of Re-Animator: The Musical and select theatrical engagements of Richard Elfman's 1980 film Forbidden Zone, often performing alongside Elfman himself. The Chicken Heads have also remained a common fixture at the California Institute of Abnormalarts, a North Hollywood nightclub and museum famous for its extensive sideshow and carnival memorabilia which exclusively hosts offbeat musical groups, burlesque and freak shows, having first played there in 2000 and having since been featured in the venue's numerous promotional materials and media coverage.

== Badd Bunny Breakout ==
CD cover for Badd Bunny Breakout

On July 13, 2013, the Chicken Heads, in collaboration with independent game company Patient Corgi, released Badd Bunny Breakout, a role-playing computer game modeled and styled after classic Super Nintendo-era RPGs such as Final Fantasy and Chrono Trigger. First announced on the band's website on September 6, 2012, Badd Bunny Breakout spent roughly a year in development, designed by Ian Luckey and Colleen Luckey with creative input by the Chicken Heads. The game was released as a free digital download on Patient Corgi's website, with a limited pressing of "Collector's Edition" CD-ROMs being made available through the Chicken Heads' website and live shows.

The soundtrack for Badd Bunny Breakout consists primarily of SNES-inspired 16-bit remixes of the Chicken Heads' songs, composed by co-developer Ian Luckey, a member of the San Diego video game music cover band Kirby's Dream Band. A 49-track soundtrack album was packaged with the CD-ROM release and also made available for free download through both Patient Corgi's website and the Chicken Heads' Bandcamp account.

In promotion of the game, the Chicken Heads hosted and performed at a game release party at the Nerdist Theater inside Los Angeles' Meltdown Comics on the day of Badd Bunny Breakout's release, where the game was displayed for public play. The following week, the band performed a set at the 2013 Gam3rcon, an independent gaming convention which coincides with San Diego Comic-Con, playing to an audience of roughly 3000 attendees. The Chicken Heads subsequently performed at the 2014 and 2015 Gam3rcons, and has since shared bills with several video game-themed bands, most notably having performed several times each with the Protomen, the Megas and Mega Ran.

== The Radioactive Chicken Heads Show ==
Production on a Radioactive Chicken Heads-themed television pilot began as early as late 2011, when the band - with video director Kyle Caraher - launched a crowdfunding campaign on Indiegogo to help finance Behind the Mutants, a documentary-styled short about the origins of the Chicken Heads, as well as the release of a DVD with never before seen footage. The campaign was promoted by a video interview between the series' antagonist, Dr. Baron von Kluckinstein (played by artist Thom Foolery), and actress Allison Scagliotti, though no mention was made if Scagliotti had any further involvement with the project.

Ultimately, the campaign only raised $1,537 of its desired $5,000 goal; though the Chicken Heads confirmed through Indiegogo that the amount was still enough to start pre-production, filming took place intermittently over a period of five years. During this time, the format of the pilot was significantly altered from its original mockumentary style into three individual segments based on the band's songs. In an Indiegogo update dated June 22, 2017, the band finally announced that principal photography was wrapped and post-production work was near completion. Throughout June and July 2017, the Chicken Heads released three promotional music videos edited together from footage from the three segments of the pilot: "The Sky is Falling", "Pox" and "Bird Brain".

On October 14, 2017, The Radioactive Chicken Heads Show received its world premiere as part of the OC Film Fiesta film festival in the Chicken Heads' hometown of Santa Ana, California, where several of the members appeared following the screening to host an in-character Q&A and perform a brief acoustic set. The next week, the pilot was screened as part of the Planet 9 Film Festival at the California Institute of Abnormalarts in North Hollywood, where it was also accompanied by an acoustic set by the Chicken Heads. Finally, the pilot was released to YouTube in individual segments on November 21 ("Bird Brain"), December 23 ("Pox") and January 22, 2018 ("The Sky is Falling"). As of 2018, there has been no official announcement as to whether or not further episodes will be filmed.

The following is a list of segments which, as of January 2018, comprise the episodes of The Radioactive Chicken Heads Show:

No.	Title	Original release date
1	"Bird Brain"	November 23, 2017
Bird Brain goes on a date with a Corpse Girl. Guest starring Count Smokula as himself.
2	"Pox"	December 23, 2017
Carrot Topp catches the chicken pox. Guest starring Dr. Demento as The Doctor and Dukey Flyswatter as Dr. Baron von Kluckinstein.
3	"The Sky is Falling"	January 22, 2018
Puke Boy spreads panic among the other Chicken Heads after a piece of the sky hits him in the head.

== Band members and characters ==
Since their inception, the Chicken Heads have preferred to present themselves as a band of fictional characters rather than costumed musicians, and as such record and perform anonymously. There are no legal names officially attributed to the band members past or present, instead only to the characters being portrayed.

The following roster reflects the Chicken Heads' current line-up as of Tales From the Coop, while the timelines are those of the characters rather than the musician. As the Chicken Heads have experienced an undocumented number of fluctuations in their typically five to ten-member line-ups, different characters play or used to play different instruments than the ones listed below.

Current/active members

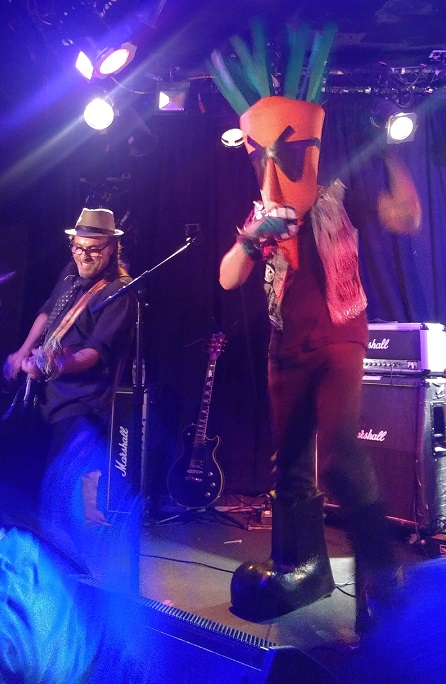
Lead singer Carrot Topp (pictured with The Dickies's Stan Lee in 2018) has been the band's sole constant member since forming the Chicken Heads in 1993.

- Carrot Topp - vocals, keyboards, accordion, drums (1993–present)
- Pastafarian - theatrics, guitar, percussion, bass, saxophone, trumpet (1993–present)
- Poultry Geist - percussion, drums, guitar, saxophone (1993–present)
- Sgt. Psyclopps - guitar, trumpet, saxophone, vocals, drums (1994–present)
- Wedgey Emmentaler - theatrics, bass, trombone, keyboards, backing vocals (1994–present)
- Raven Brain (Bird Brain) - bass, backing vocals, guitar, keyboards, trombone, trumpet (1997–present)
- El Pollo Diablo - theatrics, guitar, saxophone, drums (1997–present)
- Greasy Chicken - guitar, bass, drums, vocals (1997–present)
- Frankenchicken - theatrics, keyboards, percussion, vocals (2004–present)
- Wiccan Chicken - theatrics, keyboards (2008–present)
- Punky Rooster - keyboards, accordion (2009–2014, 2016–2018, 2024-present)
- Rockin' Robin - vocals, dancer, Queen of the Coop (2014–present)
- Nuke Boy - drums (2016–present) Eggatron - theatrics (2016–2018, 2024-present)
- Headless Mike - dancer (2012–present)
- Buffy the Dog - vocals, dancer (2015–present)

Former members

- Puke Boy - bass, backing vocals, drums, guitar (1993–2016)
- Cyco Alvin - vocals, theatrics (1993 - 1996)
- Sheez Bawl - guitar, vocals (1993–1997)
- Rosco - trumpet (1998)
- Foil Bawl - vocals, bass, percussion (1995–1998)
- Kung Pow Chicken - trumpet, guitar, drums (1995–2014)
- Bone Head - trumpet (2000–2014)
- Cheri Tomato - guitar, backing vocals (2002–2015)
- Gatorteeth - vocals, trumpet, clarinet (1994–1998)
- La Cucaracha - theatrics (1996 - 2000)
- Moustache Man - violin (1998)
- The Robot - dancer (1998–1999)
- Crash Test Dummy - bells (2021)
- Vert - backing vocals (2021)
- Boogeyman - theatrics (2023–2024)
- Skull Crow - violin, trombone (1998,2024)
- The Man Without Nostrils - violin (1998)
- Hamlien - trumpet rag (201?)

== Discography ==
=== Joe and the Chicken Heads ===
Albums

- Keep On Cluckin' (2000, Cluckin' Records, Superpickle Music Arts)

EPs

- Family Album (2002, Superpickle Music Arts)
- Joe And The Chicken Heads (1998, Cluckin' Records)

Demos

- El Pollo Loco (1994)
- Vomitzvah: Music to Puke By (1994)

=== The Chicken Heads ===
Albums

- Divine Indigestion (1995)
- Divine Indigestion (2nd Edition) (1996)
- Bird Brains (1996, Cluckin' Records)

Singles

- Liquid Fat (1997, unreleased)

=== The Radioactive Chicken Heads ===
Albums

- Growing Mold (2005, Snail Sounds)
- Music for Mutants (2008, Snail Sounds)
- Poultry Uprising (2009, Snail Sounds)
- Tales from the Coop (2017, Cluckin' Records)

EPs

- "Cluck at the Moon" (March 2023)
- "Frankenchicken" (May 2023)
- "Creeping Onions" (October 2023)
- "Officer Quackly" (June 2024)
- "Surfin' Bird" (February 2025)

Singles

- "The Curse of Frankenchicken" (October 2013)
- "Radioactive" (December 2013)
- "Pox" (October 2014)
- "Surfin' Bird" (June 2017)
- "We Are Number One" (August 2017)
- "Energy (I Got Enemies)" (March 2018)
- "Rockin' Robin" (November 2024)
- "Foiled Again" (December 2024)

=== Compilation appearances ===
As Joe and the Chicken Heads

- Hey Brother, Can You Spare Some Ska? Vol. 2 (1997, Vegas Records)
- Ska Punk and Disorderly (1997, Bankshot! Records)
- The Best Of The All-U-Can-Eat Buffet Of Musical Madness, Vol. 1: So You Gonna Got Some Songs To Perform? (1998, Sacrilicious Records)
- Hey Brother, Can You Spare Some Ska? Vol. 4 (1998, Vegas Records)
- Sign Where? Records Sampler (1998, Sign Where? Records)
- You Call This Music?? (1998, Cluckin' Records)
- Blue Prints (1999, Downfall Records)
- 'Til Someone Loses an Eye: The Safety Tips CD (1999, Superpickle Music Arts)
- Music That Won't Swallow (2000, Super Toad Records)
- Vomiting Cow Records (2000, Vomiting Cow Records)
- Flogging a Dead Cow: A Tribute to the Dead Milkmen (2001, Superpickle Music Arts)
- Going Postal: A Tribute to Mailbox (2003)

As The Radioactive Chicken Heads

- Mr. Snail's Halloween Party (2005, Snail Sounds)
- We're Not Kidding! A Tribute to Barry Louis Polisar (2009, Snail Sounds)
- My America: Quincy Punx Tribute to Benefit The West Memphis Three (2010, Crustacean Records)
- A Very Friendly Holiday 2011 (2011, Space Kidz a GoGo)
- Atom the Amazing Zombie Killer Original Motion Picture Soundtrack (2012, Bizjack Flemco Productions)
- Now That's What I Call Mabson 2012 (2013, Mabson Enterprises)
- California Creeps (2013, Roosterhead Music)
- Now That's What I Call Mabson 2013 (2014, Mabson Enterprises)
- It's Called A Separation: 10 Years of Fathers Day (2014, Related Records)
- Homemade Holidays (2014, Swoody Records)

== Videography ==
=== Music videos ===
==== Joe and the Chicken Heads ====
Year	Title	Other information	Album
1994	"Veg-O-Matic"		Vomitzvah: Music To Puke By
1994	"Pastafarian"		Vomitzvah: Music To Puke By
1994	"In the Nut House"	Parody of Suicidal Tendencies' "Institutionalized"	Vomitzvah: Music To Puke By
1994	"Cluck You"	Lost video, unknown if found.	Vomitzvah: Music To Puke By
1995	"Poopsickle"		Divine Indigestion
1995	death perception		Divine Indigestion
1995	"Kiss My Axe"		Divine Indigestion
1995	"Foiled Again"		Divine Indigestion
1995	"Chomp"		Divine Indigestion
1995	''G-Runge Era''		Divine Indigestion
1996	"Joe and the Chicken Head"		Bird Brains
	"Sgt. Psyclopps"		
1997	"Kung Pow Chicken"	As of now, it is not found.	Sign Where? Records Sampler
1998	"Man Without Nostrils"	Video was filmed as a “Part one”, part two was never filmed.	Joe and the Chicken Heads

==== Radioactive Chicken Heads ====
Year	Title	Director	Other information	Album
2007	"I Looked Into The Mirror"	Roy Knyrim	A cover of a song by Barry Louis Polisar	Music for Mutants
2007	"Pest Control"	Roy Knyrim	Features cameo appearances from Ron Jeremy and Bill Manspeaker of Green Jellÿ	Music for Mutants
2008	"Badd Bunny"	Chrix Lanier		Music for Mutants
2010	"I Eat Kids"	Kyle Caraher	A cover of a song by Barry Louis Polisar	Music for Mutants
2012	"Headless Mike"	Hunter Jackson & Radioactive Chicken Heads	Starring Mike Odd of Rosemary's Billygoat and featuring a cameo by Sinn Bodhi	Music for Mutants
2012	"Call Me Maybe"	Radioactive Chicken Heads	Punk cover of the Carly Rae Jepsen song set to in-studio footage	Non-album release
2012	"We Are Never Ever Getting Back Together"	Radioactive Chicken Heads	Punk cover of the Taylor Swift song set to in-studio footage	Non-album release
2013	"Deviled Egg"	Jim Ojala	Features a cameo by Lloyd Kaufman	Music for Mutants
2013	"Atom the Amazing Zombie Killer"	Richard Taylor and Zack Beins	Theme song from the 2012 film Atom the Amazing Zombie Killer. Features cameos by Dukey Flyswatter and Maximum Maxie of The Maxies.	Poultry Uprising
2013	"Cluck You!"	Ryan Hailey	Features animations by Gwar co-founder Hunter Jackson	Music for Mutants
2013	"Radioactive"	Radioactive Chicken Heads	Punk cover of the Imagine Dragons song set to live footage	Radioactive EP
2017	"Look Both Ways"	Sara Aliza Mossman	Alternate edit of music video originally seen in YouTube series, Amateur Treasure Hunter	Music for Mutants
2017	"We Are Number One"	Radioactive Chicken Heads	Cover of the LazyTown song set to various live footage	We Are Number One single
2017	"The Sky is Falling"	Brian Morrison	Edited from footage from the band's television pilot.	The Radioactive Chicken Heads Show
2017	"Pox"	Brian Morrison	Edited from footage from the band's television pilot. Features cameos from Dr. Demento and Dukey Flyswatter.	The Radioactive Chicken Heads Show
2017	"Bird Brain"	Brian Morrison	Edited from footage from the band's television pilot. Features cameo from Count Smokula.	The Radioactive Chicken Heads Show
2017	"Surfin' Bird (Bird is the Word)"	Sara Aliza Mossman	Cover of the 1963 song by The Trashmen.	Surfin' Bird single
2017	"Liquid Fat"	Yshai Hadar	Animated video.	Music for Mutants
2018	"Energy"	Radioactive Chicken Heads	Parody cover of the song by Drake.	Energy single
2018	"Tales From The Coop"	Yshai Hadar	Animated video.	Tales From The Coop
2018	"Cluck at the Moon"	Jim Ojala	Featuring cameos by Lloyd Kaufman, Count Smokula, Richard Elfman and Anastasia Elfman.	Tales From The Coop
2019	"Boris the Spider"	Kutay Coşkun	Animated music video. Cover of the song by The Who.	Music For Mutants
2019	"Bad Egg"	Yshai Hadar	Animated video. Song written in collaboration with Sleepy Brown	Tales From The Coop
2019	"Frankenchicken"	Freakination	Animated music video.	Tales From The Coop
2020	"Somebody's Watching Me"	Roy Knyrim	Cover of the song by Rockwell (musician). Guest appearance by Gerald Casale of DEVO.	Tales From The Coop
2021	"Willy's Wonderland"	Radioactive Chicken Heads	Parody of the song Winter Wonderland with lyrics based on the film Willy's Wonderland	Non-album release
2021	"Greasy Chicken"	Freakination	Animated music video.	Poultry Uprising
2021	"Six Little Chickens"	Radioactive Chicken Heads	Cover of the song by Émoi from the film Willy's Wonderland	Non-album release
2022	"Dr. Kluckenstein's Manifesto"	Radioactive Chicken Heads	Animated Music Video	Tales From The Coop
2024	"Officer Quackly"	Roy Knyrim		Tales From The Coop
2024	"Creeping Onions"	Brian Morrison	Featuring cameos by DJ Lance Rock, Dian Bachar, Angelo Moore of Fishbone, Count Smokula, Richard Elfman and Anastasia Elfman.	Tales From The Coop

=== Media appearances ===
==== Television appearances ====
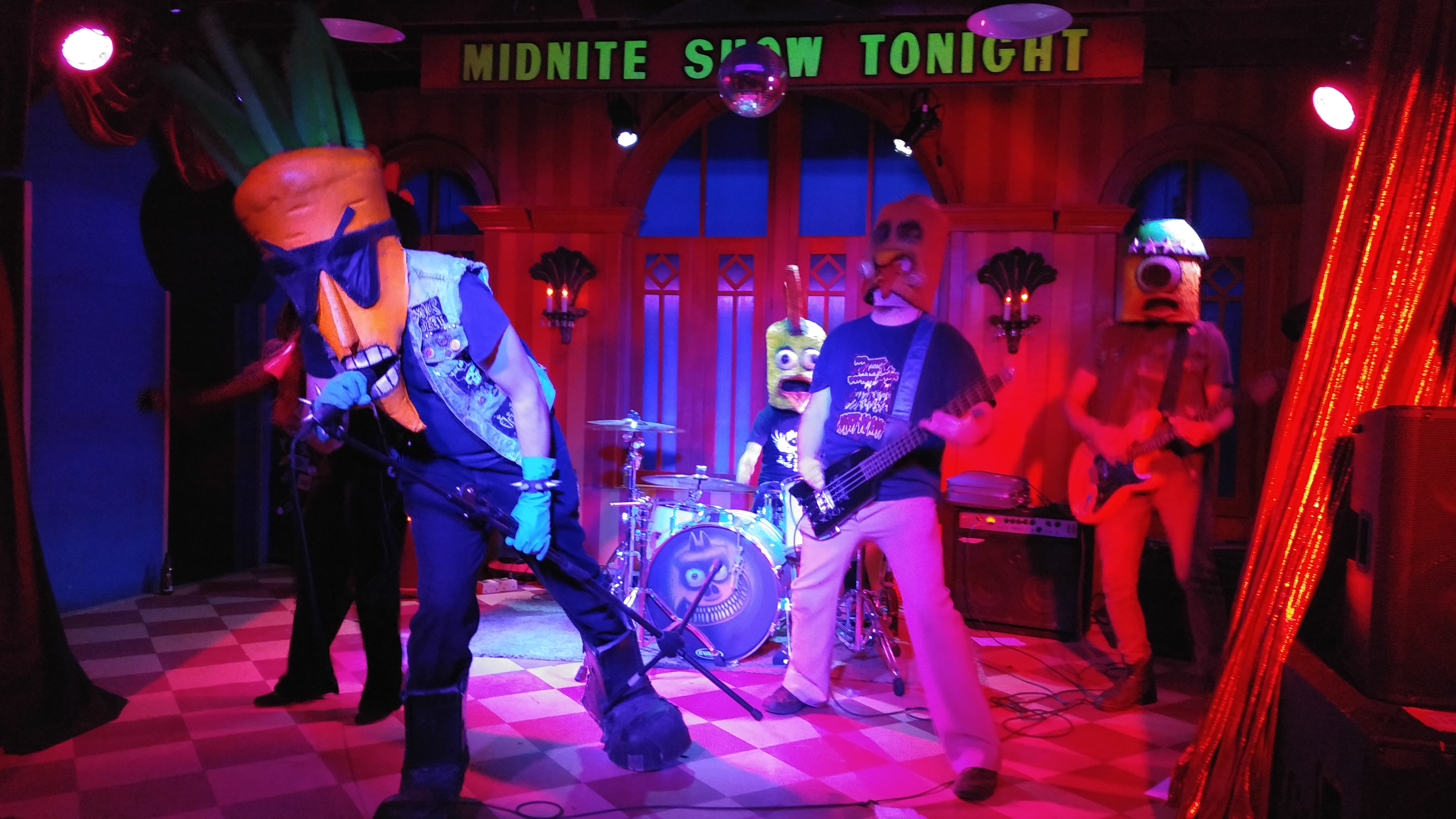
The Chicken Heads performing at the California Institute of Abnormalarts in December 2015, where they have been featured in several television appearances

- Extreme Gong (October 1998, Game Show Network)

Live performance of "Pest Control" on a Halloween episode of the talent show game show.

- The Queer Edge with Jack E. Jett (October 2005, Q Television Network)

Live performance of "Bag O' Bones" on cable television series hosted by Jack E. Jett.

- The Tyra Banks Show (November 2006, Warner Bros. Television)

Live performance of "Our Last Song" with brief interview as part of an interactive talent show-themed episode.

- Tom Green's House Tonight (November 2006, internet broadcast)

Carrot Topp plays keyboards for a live performance by Green Jellÿ while the band cameos as dancers.

- Tom Green's House Tonight (April 2008, The Comedy Network)

Cheri Tomato, Puke Boy and Bird Brain served as Count Smokula's backing band for a live performance of his song "Zombie" on a syndicated version of Tom Green's web show.

- Al Extremo (January 2012, Azteca)

Live performance with interview during a segment about the California Institute of Abnormal Arts for the Al Extremo news program on Spanish-language channel Azteca América.

- My Crazy Obsession (March 2012, TLC)

Live footage of the band's set at Freakshow Wrestling with a brief interview during a segment about Zizi Howell, a woman obsessed with carrots.

- America's Got Talent (May 2013, NBC)

The Chicken Heads appear alongside Nick Cannon in a promo commercial for season eight of the NBC reality competition.

- taff (January 2014, ProSieben)

Live footage of the band's set at Mind Warped with a brief interview during a segment about Zizi Howell, a woman obsessed with carrots.

- 1st Look (November 2014, NBC)

The California Institute of Abnormalarts was highlighted on a segment of the lifestyles show hosted by Audrina Patridge, which featured the Chicken Heads performing part of "The Curse of Frankenchicken" on the venue's stage.

- Eye on LA (October 2015, ABC)

The California Institute of Abnormalarts was again highlighted in a Halloween-themed episode of the KABC-TV local public interest program Eye on LA, featuring the Chicken Heads performing on the venue's stage, as well as showing several members dancing to a performance by Los Angeles horror rock band The Rhythm Coffin.

- The Gong Show (August 2017, ABC)

Live performance of "Surfin' Bird" on a national revival of the 1976 game show.
