= Growing Mold =

Studio album by The Radioactive Chicken Heads
- Released: March 30, 2005
- Recorded: 2004
- Genres: Art punk, comedy rock, punk rock
- Length: 18:26
- Label: Snail Sounds Records
- Producers: Aaron Cohen & Jeff Forrest

The Radioactive Chicken Heads chronology
Family Album (2002)	Growing Mold (2005)	Music for Mutants (2008)

Growing Mold is the first studio album by the California comedy rock band The Radioactive Chicken Heads, independently released on the band's own label Snail Sounds Records on March 30, 2005.

== Overview ==
The first studio album released by the Radioactive Chicken Heads following their name change from Joe and the Chicken Heads in 2004, Growing Mold also marked a change in sound from the band's early ska punk influences into more eclectic and experimental territory incorporating rock, punk, new wave, blues and country, a combination of styles which (un)Leash magazine described as "like early Mystic Knights of the Oingo Boingo meets Dead Kennedys meets gothabilly monster mash".

Growing Mold's low-key independent release flew under the radar of major music publications, but critical response from zines, university papers and alternative weeklies was largely positive. Of the more notable reviews, UC Riverside's Highlander called the Chicken Heads "one of the best bands you've probably never heard of", praising the "delightfully eclectic" album's "sly, quirky humor" and "off-the-wall style". The OC Weekly, however, offered a more ambivalent opinion, noting that while the lyrics were "funny" and "the sonic nods to...sci-fi movie soundtracks are amusingly campy", the Chicken Heads "are a band that's best swallowed live" and that studio recordings "can never grasp the entire C-Head experience".

Although Growing Mold didn't receive any conventional radio airplay, "I Eat Kids", a cowpunk cover of a 1978 song by offbeat children's musician Barry Louis Polisar, was selected to air on the nationally syndicated novelty song showcase The Dr. Demento Show in July 2005. In November 2006, the Chicken Heads appeared on an episode of The Tyra Banks Show, performing "Our Last Song" as part of a talent show-themed episode which featured intentionally weird and unusual acts. The band ultimately lost their set to John the Running Painter, a painter on a treadmill, by an audience vote of 73% to 27%.

"Pest Control" and "I Eat Kids" were later re-recorded and "I Looked into the Mirror (What Did the Mirror Say?)", was remixed for the Chicken Heads' 2008 album Music for Mutants, each of which received music videos. Remixes of the original Growing Mold recordings of "Bag O' Bones", "Stitch Me Up" and "Our Last Song" were also featured on the album.

== Track listing ==
All songs written and composed by The Radioactive Chicken Heads, except where noted otherwise.

No.	Title	Length
1.	"Bag O' Bones"	3:00
2.	"I Looked Into the Mirror (What Did the Mirror Say?)" (Barry Louis Polisar)	2:54
3.	"Waltzing on Eggshells"	1:04
4.	"Earth vs. the Earthmen"	1:40
5.	"Growing Mold"	2:29
6.	"Stitch Me Up"	1:21
7.	"Pest Control"	2:19
8.	"Archaeopteryx"	2:02
9.	"I Eat Kids" (Barry Louis Polisar)	1:31
10.	"Our Last Song"	1:26
Total length:		18:26

=== Previous recordings ===
- "Pest Control" first appeared on several 1998 compilations before being officially released on Joe and the Chicken Heads' 2000 album Keep on Cluckin'.

== Credits ==
The Radioactive Chicken Heads

Individual credits were not listed in the album's liner notes. Band roster at time of album's release:

- Carrot Topp - vocals
- Cheri Tomato - guitar
- Bird Brain - guitar
- Pastafarian - bass
- Puke Boy - drums
- Frankenchicken - keyboards
- Bone Head - trumpet
- El Pollo Diablo - percussion

Additional musicians

- Jeff Forrest - lead guitar on track 2
- Jason Krane - lead guitar on tracks 1, 4 and 5, rhythm guitar on tracks 2 and 10
- Ego Plum - guitar on track 8
