= Ego Plum =

American composer

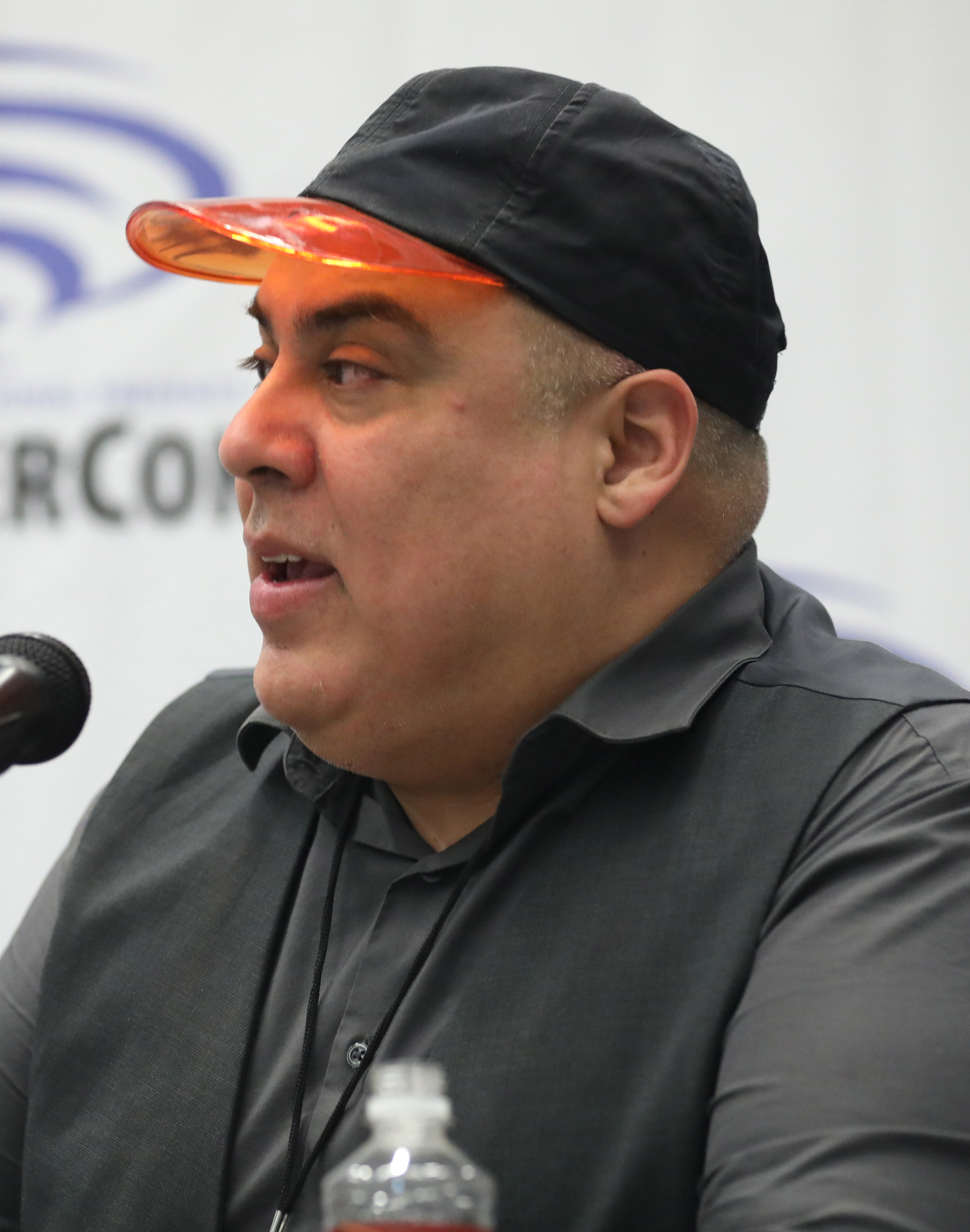
- Plum at the 2024 WonderCon

Background information
- Born: Ernesto Guerrero; February 27, 1975 (age 51); Los Angeles, California, U.S.
- Occupations: Film composer, multi-instrumentalist, record producer
- Years active: 1996–present
- Website: www.egoplum.com

Ego Plum (born February 27, 1975) is an American film composer, musician, and performer. He is best known for his work on The Cuphead Show!, The Patrick Star Show, Kamp Koral, SpongeBob SquarePants, Jellystone!, Making Fiends and Harvey Beaks.

== Early life ==
Plum's earliest music influences trace back to the scores for Pee-Wee's Playhouse created by Mark Mothersbaugh, Danny Elfman, and The Residents. His interest in The Residents was developed further, when two years later, at the age of 13, Plum's older brothers took him to a performance of "Cube E", a three-act stage show by The Residents. Plum has frequently cites The Residents as his initial inspiration to become a performer. "I became convinced that music could be weird, subversive and meaningful", he spoke of The Residents' influence, "I knew that one day I would be doing something similar". Plum immediately began composing music on his brothers' instruments and recording home-made demos on Casio keyboards with 4-track recorders. Plum is proficient on multiple instruments and yet is entirely self-taught; his biography on the Making Fiends website claims his only formal musical training was completing a tap dance class at East Los Angeles College.

Plum's other musical influences include Carl Stalling's arrangements of Raymond Scott's music for Looney Tunes and Merrie Melodies. He has listed further influence from punk rock and new wave, in particular Devo, Oingo Boingo and the Dead Kennedys, as well as the work of film composers Franz Waxman and Bernard Herrmann. He attributed Stalling and Scott influences as 1930s jazz.

== Career ==
=== Early career ===
After making the rounds as a drummer in the Los Angeles punk scene, Plum's first break came in 1996 when he contributed several songs to the soundtrack of Blood Slaves of the Vampire Wolf, a no-budget independent horror film directed by Ed Wood regular Conrad Brooks. The following year, Plum self-released his debut album Anthology of Infection, Vol. 1, a compilation of instrumental pieces written and recorded between 1990 and 1997, establishing a website promoting his music and offering his composing services to amateur filmmakers. A second compilation of newer instrumental material, Anthology of Infection, Vol. 2, was released in January 2000 to positive reviews, with Razorcake calling it "simply amazing" and Style Weekly praising Plum as "truly adept at songwriting".

Plum spent most of his twenties working in a cubicle at the University of California, Los Angeles, making music in his spare time as a hobby, with a wish to score cartoons. This want for scoring animation was one of the inspirations behind his first album, 'Anthology Of Infection Volume One' In 1996 he composed the score for a film titled Blood Slaves of the Vampire Wolf, which his first credited role.

=== Ebola Music Orchestra ===
In 1998, Plum began assembling the Ebola Music Orchestra, a ten-piece ensemble including a horn section, strings and accordions as the means of performing songs from Anthology of Infection in a concert setting, with Plum serving as the musical director as well as switching between guitar, keyboards, xylophone and various unique instruments. The original incarnations of the Ebola Music Orchestra featured numerous performers with physical deformities. "I am equally fascinated by people who are different but not because they are shocking or weird, but because they are beautiful", Plum explained, "I love talented people who embrace the things that make them different from the rest of the world". At one point, the orchestra was to be featured on the 2000 NBC revival of the human interest series You Asked For It, but NBC executives quickly pulled the plug on the segment out of concern it would be too controversial for prime time television (Plum speculated that it was "Gerome, the legless thalidomide-baby breakdancer" which broke the deal). Over time the group became less conceptual and more of a rock-oriented ensemble of Plum's "most talented friends performing the imaginary cartoon soundtracks I had in my head". The Ebola Music Orchestra released their debut album The Rat King in 2007. Critical response to the album was largely positive, including "highly recommended" praise from BlogCritics, which succinctly concluded their review with "[Ego Plum]'s got skillz".

=== Television ===
Whilst still working at UCLA, Plum saw a screening of Amy Winfrey's 1999 short film The Bad Plant. The film made a strong impression on Plum, who sought out Winfrey to give his Anthology of Infection CD from. A year or two later, Winfrey contacted Plum to tell him she was developing a show for Nickelodeon, Making Fiends. Making Fiends premiered on October 4, 2008. Ego composed original material for the show and worked with songs written by series creator Amy Winfrey. According to the show's production blog, Plum took a unique approach to scoring Making Fiends, frequently using toy instruments which were sometimes deliberately left out of tune and incorporating unusual sounds such as dripping water and goat bleats to give the score "an off-kilter, childlike quality". Although Making Fiends was cancelled after one season, the series spawned an enduring cult following and Plum continued a working relationship with Nickelodeon: in 2009, he was asked to compose the theme song to Planet Sheen, a spin-off of the hit series The Adventures of Jimmy Neutron: Boy Genius. Plum was ultimately not selected to score the series, though has since posted his original demos online.

Plum continued his work in scoring animated television with the Disney Channel original series Star vs. the Forces of Evil, composing the ending credits theme with Daron Nefcy. In late 2014, Plum announced that he had signed a contract to write songs and music for Harvey Beaks (then titled Bad Seeds), a new Nickelodeon series from C.H. Greenblatt, the creator of Cartoon Network's Chowder. Upon signing onto the show, Plum successfully negotiated the use of a 40-piece orchestra to record the series' music, making Harvey Beaks the first Nickelodeon show and one of the very few animated cable series to utilize a full orchestral score.

=== Stage ===
Plum made his debut composing for the stage in 2009 with The Gogol Project, an original adaptation of three short stories by Nikolai Gogol created by the Rogue Artists Ensemble. The Gogol Project opened at the Bootleg Theater in Westlake to critical acclaim, winning Plum a 2009/2010 Ovation Award for Music Composition for a Play. Plum subsequently scored A Noise Within's 2012 adaptation of Charles Dickens' A Christmas Carol and partnered with the Rogues again writing original songs and music for their 2013 production of Pinocchio.

=== Disneyland ===
Plum composed the music for the new extended queue for Disneyland's The Haunted Mansion, which debuted in November 2024. The music is made up of various arrangements of Buddy Baker's Grim Grinning Ghosts. Plum, a lifelong Disneyland fan, approached the project as if it were a collaboration with Baker. He also said that composing music for The Haunted Mansion was "an honor of a lifetime".

== Collaborations ==
Over the course of his career, Ego Plum has collaborated with many independent and high-profile musicians and composers. One of his more prolific partnerships has been with David J, bassist for the gothic rock bands Bauhaus and Love and Rockets. In 2007, J was hired to score independent filmmaker Ramzi Abed's Black Dahlia-inspired feature The Devil's Muse when Abed introduced him to Plum's demos after Plum expressed to Abed a desire to help work on the film. According to J, he was "enormously impressed" by Plum's music: "All lush film noir atmospherics, Rotaesque strings and what sounded like the fever dreams of Raymond Scott. I had a partner in crime!". After working together on The Devil's Muse, Plum subsequently co-composed and performed on several musical projects with J, including the 2006 re-release and re-recording of J's album V for Vendetta and his 2011 stage play The Chanteuse and the Devil's Muse and its soundtrack accompaniment.

=== Black Francis ===
In 2009, Plum engineered and recorded drums and keyboards for the David J-produced Petits Fours, the debut album from Grand Duchy, a project fronted by Black Francis of the Pixies. In December of that year, Plum accompanied J for a five-song set with Black Francis as part of an all-star benefit show at the Echoplex in Los Angeles, performing guitar, banjo and ukulele on covers of John Lennon's "Jealous Guy", Daniel Johnston's "Some Things Last a Long Time", the Pixies' "Monkey Gone to Heaven", "In Heaven" from Eraserhead and Mott the Hoople's "All the Young Dudes".

=== Gidget Gein & Steve Bartek ===
Plum befriended artist and Marilyn Manson co-founder Gidget Gein in the early 2000s, eventually composing original music for Gein's 2004 "Gollywood" art and fashion shows for his Use Once and Destroy Couture fashion line. Following Gein's death in 2008, Plum digitally released these compositions as a soundtrack album, also featuring snippets of an in-studio jam between Plum and Gein.

Plum is a fervent admirer of the music and electronic innovation of composer Raymond Scott. In 2012, Plum worked with Oingo Boingo guitarist Steve Bartek in arranging a live tribute show held at the Walt Disney Concert Hall's REDCAT entitled "Machine Man: The Musical Mayhem of Raymond Scott," which was produced in cooperation with Jeff Winner of The Raymond Scott Archives. Bartek, himself a composer and orchestrator for film and television, had previously worked with Plum providing guitar and theremin for The Gogol Project's soundtrack release and currently produces Plum's score for Harvey Beaks.

=== The Radioactive Chicken Heads ===
Plum has worked on several projects with the Orange County comedy punk band The Radioactive Chicken Heads, receiving credits on their albums Growing Mold and Music for Mutants for additional guitar tracks and songwriting. He also helped produce, arrange and record the debut album from the Chicken Heads garage pop side project the Purple Mums and in March 2015, Plum wrote and directed a three-act absurdist stage play entitled The Radioactive Chicken Heads Tanksgiving Special which premiered at The Steve Allen Theater in Los Angeles, featuring the band performing live music to a comedic narrative featuring guest appearances from actor Dukey Flyswatter, Mike Odd of Rosemary's Billygoat and Hunter Jackson of Gwar.

=== Danny Elfman ===
In 2012, film director and Oingo Boingo co-founder Richard Elfman announced plans to film a sequel to his 1980 cult musical Forbidden Zone, revealing that Plum would be contributing music and songs in conjunction with original composer Danny Elfman, whose commitments in Hollywood prevented him from dedicating himself to the project full-time. Plum, a lifelong Oingo Boingo fan, called the opportunity "something out of a dream". Although little is known about the current status of production following a successful IndieGoGo campaign in May 2014, preliminary music by Plum and Elfman has been used in several promotional videos.

== Discography ==
Solo releases

Year	Title	Notes
1997	Anthology of Infection, Vol. 1	
2000	Anthology of Infection, Vol. 2	
2007	The Rat King	As Ego Plum and the Ebola Music Orchestra
2010	"Gasoline"	Digital single
2012	Transatlantic Pictures	EP, collaboration with Tip Toe Topic
2012	Los Angeles Research, Inc.	As Los Angeles Research, Inc.
2012	About Two Squares	

Soundtracks

Year	Title	Notes
2004	Gidget Gein's Gollywood	
2005	Music for Klaklo Kouture: Kollection One	
2006	Pronsongs (Musical Selections from Pornographic Films)	
2008	The Devil's Muse (Music from the Motion Picture)	Collaboration with David J
2009	Gogol Project (Original Stage Production Soundtrack)	
2012	The Ghastly Love of Johnny X (Music from the Motion Picture Soundtrack)	Music and lyrics by Scott Martin

== Filmography ==
=== Film ===
Year	Title	Notes
1996	Blood Slaves of the Vampire Wolf	
1996	The Cocoon	Animated film
2001	The Jolly Man	
2004	In the Land of Milk and Honey	
2005	Haunted Boat	Additional music
2005	Wit's End	Additional music
2007	The Devil's Muse	Orchestration, additional music (with David J)
2012	The Ghastly Love of Johnny X	Composer, arranger
2012	Into the Zone: The Story of the Cacophony Society	Documentary feature
2025	Aztec Batman: Clash of Empires	Animated film
2025	A Blind Bargain	Composer

=== Television ===
Year	Title	Notes
2008	Making Fiends	Composer
2012	Team Smithereen	Composer
2012-2016	Nickelodeon Animated Shorts Program	Composer (“Cabrito and Chewy”, “Marty’s Exotic Animals”, “Charlie & Mr Two”, “Menehunes”, “Bad Bad Bunny”, “Magic Children Doing Things”, “Cupcakery of Doom” and “Bug Salad”)
2014	Star vs. the Forces of Evil	Songwriter (end theme; Seasons 1–2)
2015–17	Harvey Beaks	Composer
2017–19	Welcome to the Wayne	Composer
2018	Bug Salad	Composer
2019–25	SpongeBob SquarePants	Composer and music editor ("Swamp Mates", "One Trick Sponge", "Broken Alarm", "SpongeBob in RandomLand", "Goofy Scoopers", and "Making Waves")
2020–21	Santiago of the Seas	Additional composer
2021–24	Kamp Koral: SpongeBob's Under Years	Music editor
2021–present	The Patrick Star Show	Theme music composer and music editor
2021–25	Jellystone!	Composer
2022	The Cuphead Show!	Composer
