= We Are Number One =

2014 song from children's show LazyTown

- Still frame from the music video. From left to right, Bobbie (Björn Thors), Robbie (Stefán Karl Stefánsson), Tobbie (Snorri Engilbertsson), and Flobbie (Bergur Þór Ingólfsson).

Song by Máni Svavarsson and Stefán Karl Stefánsson
- Released: 3 October 2014
- Recorded: 2014
- Genre: Ska
- Length: 2:18
- Label: LazyTown Entertainment
- Songwriter: Máni Svavarsson

Music video
- "We Are Number One" on YouTube

"We Are Number One" is a song from the English-language Icelandic children's television series LazyTown, composed by Máni Svavarsson. The song was featured in the twelfth episode of the show's fourth season, entitled "Robbie's Dream Team", which is the 76th episode overall, and the penultimate episode of the series.

While the song was released in 2014, the song gained significant online popularity in late 2016 and became common among internet memes and comical remixes, especially in support of the lead singer, Stefán Karl Stefánsson (Robbie Rotten), who had been diagnosed with bile duct cancer and died on 21 August 2018.

== Music video ==
The music video is composed of clips from the LazyTown episode "Robbie's Dream Team". Robbie Rotten, the primary antagonist of LazyTown, attempts to teach his "dream team" of villainous accomplices (three fictional doppelgänger actors for children's parties, named Bobbie, Tobbie, and Flobbie Rotten) how to successfully catch a superhero, specifically Sportacus.

Robbie demonstrates different methods to his team: an overhead cage attached to a tree, a trapping pit, a large butterfly net, a false apple containing enough sugar to render the sugar-averse Sportacus unconscious, a somewhat small fishing net, and banana peels intended to cause Sportacus to slip while running. Almost all methods backfire, resulting in either Robbie or his team falling into the traps.

The sugar apple is an effective trick, successfully incapacitating Sportacus and giving Robbie and his team a chance to put him in a portable cage. Robbie's three teammates relocate the trapped Sportacus to Robbie's underground headquarters while Robbie stays on the surface to set up a cannon, revealed in the full episode to be the way Robbie intends to run Sportacus out of town. His plans are thwarted when Stephanie and Stingy open the base's periscope and use its cylindrical interior to transport a real apple to Sportacus. The apple rolls towards the cage undetected by the now-sleeping Bobbie, Tobbie, and Flobbie. Sportacus regains consciousness, eats the apple, and regains his power lost to the sugar apple. He then uses his reclaimed strength to break free from the cage and coax his three captors to play sports with him on the surface of LazyTown.

Robbie watches as his previous companions play sports with Sportacus. Outraged, he walks towards them and kicks a bucket, which hits and triggers Robbie's cannon, blasting him away from the scene on the cannonball. The video ends with Bobbie, Tobbie, and Flobbie accidentally falling into the trapping pit constructed to capture Sportacus, reinforcing for a final time the clumsiness of the team.

The music video was officially uploaded on the LazyTown YouTube channel on 25 July 2015, and has gained more than 170 million views as of February 2026.

== History ==
The song originally had the working title called "Villain Number One" before it was changed to "We Are Number One".

During production, many lyrics were cut from the final version. These lyrics first surfaced to the public when it was revealed by Máni during the live stream that Stefán held on Facebook on 11 December 2016, at the Icelandic studios where the show was filmed.

== Internet popularity ==
In September 2016, two years after the LazyTown episode aired in 2014 and was posted to the LazyTown YouTube channel in 2015, "We Are Number One" became an Internet meme. Shortly afterwards, on October 13, Robbie Rotten's performer Stefán Karl Stefánsson announced that he had been diagnosed with bile duct cancer after news of him being ill had spread locally. A campaign was created by Mark Valenti, head writer for LazyTown, on the crowdfunding platform GoFundMe to pay for Stefánsson's living costs while he was too unwell to work, and the creators of these parodies used their videos to raise awareness for the campaign. As of 20 December 2016, the campaign had surpassed its $100,000 goal.

To thank the contributors, Stefán held a live stream on Facebook on 11 December 2016, where he performed "We Are Number One" with the other actors (Björn Thors, Bergur Þór Ingólfsson, Snorri Engilbertsson) from the original music video which was later uploaded to his personal YouTube channel.

=== Internet memes ===
The song gained popularity in September 2016, when the first remix was uploaded onto the bait-and-switch YouTube channel SiIvaGunner, disguised as an actual song from the video game Kirby Super Star Ultra. Various parodies have been subsequently uploaded since, most prominently by the YouTuber and disk jockey Grandayy, as well as proper cover versions by bands such as comedy punk group the Radioactive Chicken Heads.

Typically, these parodies take the form of the original music video edited in some irregular and often highly complex way, an evolution of an existing but dormant-prior internet meme format that had seen mild popularity in the mid-2000s where editors would replace proper nouns in the opening cutscene of the video game Hotel Mario with humorous clips and quotes from within Hotel Mario or other media, a format that had received a nostalgic resurgence through memes relating to the Filipino-American animated sitcom The Nutshack, also popularised by SiIvaGunner. A common title format would begin with the phrase "We Are Number One but...", followed by a list of changes from the original, such as "We Are Number One but it's 1 hour long" or "We Are Number One but it's co-performed by Epic Sax Guy". Due to the extent of modification and resulting length of the title, they would occasionally be placed in the video description. This type of remix was common in 2016, particularly during the year's waning months; a The Verge article described "We Are Number One" and other, similar remixes as "weird solipsistic creation[s]".

==== Alternative versions ====
The official LazyTown YouTube channel has posted several videos relating to the song, including an hour loop of the original song, an instrumental version, a reversed instrumental version, every "one" being replaced by "The Mine Song" (another song from the series, also with numerous parodies, which later became an internet meme in November 2016), a compilation of the songs with other well-known songs from the series (however, in PAL speed) and the full episode that the song appeared in, "Robbie's Dream Team" from 2014. The original tracks (otherwise known as the "stems") used in composing the song were released shortly after.

=== Eurovision petition ===
A petition was set up to have Stefán Karl perform the song to represent Iceland at the Eurovision Song Contest, receiving over 12,000 signatures. The petition wanted Stefánsson to participate in the 2017 edition, but he did not apply, acknowledging that he was unlikely to do so, as recovering from his cancer was a bigger priority.
