= Comedy rock =

Rock music that is comedic

- Other names: Humorcore
- Stylistic origins: Rock; comedy music; satirical music
- Cultural origins: Early 1950s, US; Mid-1950s – early 1960s, UK

Local scenes
- Sunset Strip, West Hollywood, California

Comedy rock is a genre of rock music that is comedic in nature. It is often mixed with satire or irony.

== Bands and songs ==
=== Early ===
Early American examples include Stan Freberg, who lampooned artists such as Elvis Presley, Harry Belafonte and the Platters, and Sheb Wooley. The latter's "Purple People Eater" reached No. 1 on the Billboard pop chart in 1958 and stayed there for six weeks.

In Britain during the 1950s and early 1960s, comedians such as Charlie Drake and the Goons frequently appeared in the top ten with humorous rock 'n' roll records—the latter, along with Lewis Carroll and Edward Lear, were to influence the word-play of John Lennon's lyrics. Later British groups specialised in comedy: these included the Scaffold, the Bonzo Dog Doo-Dah Band and Alberto y Lost Trios Paranoias. Later in Britain, in the 2000s, Mitch Benn released several studio albums that satirised current affairs using various musical genres, but mainly rock. His 2012 Breaking Strings album was critically acclaimed for its rock sensibility.

AllMusic described Frank Zappa as the "godfather" of comedy rock. The pop rock and folk rock band the Turtles released a comedy rock album, The Turtles Present the Battle of the Bands, in 1968, though the band had previously incorporated humor into their songs. Two of its members, Howard Kaylan and Mark Volman, later performed more explicitly comedic songs as Flo & Eddie with their own band and with Frank Zappa.

=== Later ===
Several modern comedy rock bands have experienced mainstream commercial success. Duos Tenacious D and Flight of the Conchords both released platinum-selling albums and starred in their own respective comedic television series. Dan Finnerty with his the Dan Band has made comedy rock appearances in the Todd Phillips films Old School and The Hangover spoofing "Total Eclipse of the Heart" and "Candy Shop", as well as his live show, which parodies female cover songs and was filmed as a one-hour TV special directed by McG and executive produced by Steven Spielberg. Stephen Lynch from New York developed a following with several Opie and Anthony appearances which led to two specials on Comedy Central. He performed on Broadway with the production of Grease.

With over 12 million albums sold, song parodist "Weird Al" Yankovic remains the highest-selling comedy act in history, with his 2014 album Mandatory Fun having debuted at #1 on the Billboard 200, the first comedy album to do so since Allan Sherman's My Son, the Nut in 1963. Rock has been the target of many spoofs and several spoof bands have gone on to have hit records, for example Spinal Tap in the U.S., and the Hee Bee Gee Bees, The Rutles, and Bad News in the UK. The band Steel Panther has become a fixture on the Los Angeles Sunset Strip with their parody of 1980s glam metal, and their success opened the doors for other spoof bands such as the Jimi Homeless Experience.

Other spoof bands such as Dread Zeppelin, Beatallica and Those Darn Accordions rely on unusual or intentionally contrasting genre-mixing for comic effect. The Residents are well-known for their unusual, heavily distorted covers of pop and rock songs. Comedy rock duo Ninja Sex Party, who have collaborated with Steel Panther on occasion, blend rock and synthpop and have produced songs that parody the dubstep and heavy metal genres. They have enjoyed success from their online popularity. Another band, Primus, is known for their wacky lyrics and comedic music videos. Gorillaz is a British virtual band whose fictional, animated members parody contemporary trends in popular music.

Geddy Lee of Rush did a guest appearance on the novelty Take Off, supporting his grade school classmate Rick Moranis. The song peaked at number 16 on the Billboard 100 singles chart in March 1982, higher than any of Rush's songs ever charted on the U.S. top 40. Despite selling 40 million albums worldwide, Rush's biggest hit on that chart, "New World Man", reached only number 21, and thus "Take Off" was Lee's biggest hit.

Many bands within the alternative rock and college rock spectrum are known for their incorporation of humorous and satirical songs, with bands such as Barenaked Ladies, Electric Six, Mindless Self Indulgence, They Might Be Giants, the Presidents of the United States of America, Bloodhound Gang, System of a Down, Ween, Weezer, Wheatus and Camper Van Beethoven finding both mainstream and independent success in the United States, as well as bands such as Parokya ni Edgar, Knorkator, and Moxy Früvous who found success in their countries of origin. Punk rock and pop punk has made its contribution to the comedy rock ranks, with such bands as the Aquabats, Blink-182, Bowling for Soup, Patent Pending, Dead Kennedys, the Dead Milkmen, Macc Lads, the Meatmen, Mojo Nixon, the Radioactive Chicken Heads and the Vandals.

Heavy metal has also produced many humor-oriented and satirical bands, including Green Jellÿ, Lawnmower Deth, Massacration, M.O.D., Big Dumb Face, Electric Callboy, Primus, Nanowar of Steel, J.B.O., Psychostick, Ludichrist, Bad News, Spinal Tap, Okilly Dokilly, Scatterbrain and Infant Annihilator, whose comedic shtick mostly revolves around parodying heavy metal clichés and ironically spoofing the seriousness of many traditional metal bands, while other bands such as Gwar, Lordi, Knorkator and Rosemary's Billygoat utilize outrageous costumes and over-the-top stage shows. The virtual band Dethklok is a death metal spoof featured in the Adult Swim animated TV show Metalocalypse, and their album The Dethalbum debuted at No. 21 on the Billboard Top 200 list.

== See also ==
- Comedy hip-hop
- Parody music
- Parody in popular music
