= Parody in popular music =

The original use of the term "parody" in music referred to re-use for wholly serious purposes of existing music. In popular music that sense of "parody" is still applicable to the use of folk music in the serious songs of such writers as Bob Dylan, but in general, "parody" in popular music refers to the humorous distortion of musical ideas or lyrics or general style of music.

== Origins ==
Before the 20th century popular songs frequently borrowed hymn tunes and other church music and substituted secular words. John Brown's Body, the marching song of the American Civil War, was based on the tune of an earlier camp-meeting and revival hymn, and was later fitted with the words "Mine eyes have seen the glory of the coming of the Lord", by Julia Ward Howe. This practice continued into the First World War, with many of the soldiers' songs being based on hymn tunes (for instance "When this lousy war is over", to the tune of "What a Friend We Have in Jesus" and "We are Fred Karno's Army", to the tune of "The Church's One Foundation"). Folk song has often been written to existing tunes, or slight modifications of them. This is another very old (and usually non-humorous) kind of musical parody that still continues. For instance, Bob Dylan took the tune of the old slave song "No more auction block for me" as the basis for "Blowin' in the Wind".

== 1918–1959 ==
The emerging form of jazz music frequently recycled themes from the staider "white" popular music of the time, as well as producing occasional parodies (usually called "travesties") of well known classical themes.

In the 1940s, Spike Jones and his City Slickers parodied popular music in their own unique way, not by changing lyrics, but adding wild sound effects and comedic stylings to formerly staid old songs such as "Cocktails for Two" and "April Showers." Beginning in 1949, Homer and Jethro did country music arrangements of popular songs, with parody lyrics, such as "Hart Brake Motel" (for "Heartbreak Hotel") and "The Battle of Kookamonga" (after Johnny Horton's "The Battle of New Orleans").

The comedy pianist Victor Borge coined some of his signature bits on Bing Crosby's radio show during the 1940s, and later popularized them on TV on Dean Martin's show. Borge parodied classical composition styles by taking a very well known tune like "Happy Birthday to You" and playing it in the styles of Mozart, Brahms, Wagner, Beethoven and others. He would also parody two compositions simultaneously by finding common melody notes and using them for transitioning one composition into another, the most famous example being "Moonlight Sonata" transitioning into "Night and Day" (or a minor version of "Happy Birthday to You").

The 1957 Broadway musical Jamaica parodied the then very fashionable commercial variety of calypso music. A musical using heavy parody was the 1959 show Little Mary Sunshine, which poked fun at old-fashioned operetta.

"Where Is Your Heart," a serious parody of "It's April Again" from Moulin Rouge, was a chart-topping hit for Mantovani and Percy Faith in the United Kingdom and United States, respectively, in 1953. Both records titled the record "The Song from (the) Moulin Rouge."

== 1960–1980 ==
Stan Freberg created parodies of popular songs in the 1950s and 1960s, mocking the musical conventions of the day, such as Elvis Presley's "Heartbreak Hotel", in which the vocalist rips his jeans from too much hip-swiveling and drowns in reverberative sound effects at the end. Another major parodist was Allan Sherman, who began making hit records with parodies such as the now-classic "Hello Muddah, Hello Fadduh (A Letter from Camp)" (to the tune of Amilcare Ponchielli's "Dance of the Hours" from the opera La Gioconda) and "When I Was A Lad" (after Gilbert & Sullivan's "Ruler of the Queen's Navee" from "HMS Pinafore").

Bandleader and pianist Paul Weston and his wife, singer Jo Stafford, created the musical duo, "Jonathan and Darlene Edwards", as a parody of bad cabaret acts. Initially it began as a private party joke but they recorded several albums and one, Jonathan and Darlene Edwards in Paris, won a Grammy Award in 1961 for best comedy record.

The self-described "piano-wielding fugitive from Harvard", Tom Lehrer; and Victor Borge, originally from Denmark, who switched from a concert piano career to comedy, have also created parodies of classical piano pieces and opera.

In 1965, musical satirist Peter Schickele created P. D. Q. Bach, a supposedly newly discovered member of the Bach family, whose creative output parodies musicological scholarship, the conventions of Baroque and classical music, as well as introducing elements of slapstick comedy. Schickele continued to tour and record under the pseudonym P. D. Q. Bach until his death in January 2024.

Ray Stevens became a country star in the 1970s and 1980s with a few serious songs (such as "Everything is Beautiful"), more novelty songs (such as "The Streak", "Shriner's Convention", and "Mississippi Squirrel Revival") and many parody songs, such as the adult-contemporary send-up "I Need Your Help Barry Manilow", and the Beach Boys parody "Surfin USSR".

The Barron Knights became famous for their parodies of pop songs in the 1970s.

The song "A Little Green Rosetta" from the Frank Zappa album Joe's Garage lampoons Steve Gadd's status as one of the highest-paid session drummers in popular music. The music parodies a number of styles including reggae and lounge jazz.

== 1980–present ==
A successful parodist is "Weird Al" Yankovic, now in his fourth decade of writing song parodies. He got his start sending tapes to be played by Barret Hansen, AKA Dr. Demento, on his nationally syndicated radio show. Seattle, WA-based disc jockey and longtime parodist Bob Rivers records parodies of hit songs from a variety of genres and periods satirizing current events. Dabbling in topical parodies is Buffalo, New York-based humorist Mark Russell, who appears several times a year on PBS television. The New York, NY performing troupe Forbidden Broadway annually parodies the Great White Way's most popular current musicals and their songs on stage and recordings.

In the science fiction fan community, filk music thrives as a source of both parodies and original music, as it has since at least the 1930s.

Tom Lehrer song "The Elements" adapts a tune from Gilbert & Sullivan to the periodic table, and more recently he turned "That's Entertainment" into a précis on his real vocation, "That's Mathematics" (carefully altering the melody to avoid litigation).

Ray Charles wrote his hit song "I Got a Woman" as a paraphrase on gospel songs, which provoked anger from the Christian community. The 1992 film Sister Act had Whoopi Goldberg's character do the opposite with Mary Wells' "My Guy", rewriting its lyrics (and subsequently re-titling it as "My God") to accommodate the nun choir.

Richard Cheese and the Lounge Kittens produce parodies not in the traditional sense of someone like Yankovic, but rather derive their humor from exactly the opposite means. While traditional parody puts new lyrics to largely unchanged music, they keep the lyrics intact but alter the musical style, thus altering the intent of the song. The humor comes from the juxtaposition of very familiar lyrics from popular rap, metal, and rock songs (particularly containing profane, violent, or sexually explicit lyrics) with their exceedingly clean, "white bread", campy, lounge style. Me First and the Gimme Gimmes does likewise in a complete opposite manner: they perform hard, sped-up punk renditions of folk songs, soft rock, showtunes, R&B, and other genres not usually associated with punk. Yankovic has also ventured into this practice; all but two of his albums feature medleys of either classic rock or then-current hit songs done as fast polkas. Ray Stevens has had hits of Glenn Miller's "In the Mood" done in the style of clucking chickens, and a honky-tonk or bluegrass version of Michael Jackson's "Bad".

Blur's "Song 2" (1997) has been described as a parody of the grunge genre, while others state that it was a parody of radio hits and the music industry with a punk rock chorus.

Musical parody in recent years has included the 2005 musical Altar Boyz, which parodies both Christian rock and the "boy band" style of pop, the Christian parody band Apologetix, who have targeted popular music from the 1950s to the present, and the Capitol Steps, a group of current and former U.S. Congress staff members based in Washington, DC who focus on politics and other public figures. Mac Sabbath, a tribute band who perform Black Sabbath songs with rewritten lyrics satirizing the fast food industry in McDonald's-themed costumes and stage theatrics, went viral in late 2014, bringing the band notable press coverage and enabling them to tour internationally.

In 2009, a group from London, the Midnight Beast, gained fame after posting on YouTube their parody of the song "Tik Tok" by Ke$ha. Since then, the group has parodied other pop songs. Rucka Rucka Ali also made a parody of "Tik Tok" called "Go Cops". A popular theme of parodies on YouTube today is video games, with the most common ones being Call of Duty, Grand Theft Auto and (the most prevalent) Minecraft.

As it has become easier to publish songs quickly online, increasing volumes of topical, comic parodies have begun to emerge. In the UK these have tended to be similar in nature to the type of news inspired songs which have regularly appeared on the BBC Radio 4 comedy show The Now Show since 1998. The Amateur Transplants, one group which produce these, came to public attention in 2005 with the song “London Underground”, satirizing the then strikes, and parodying the Jam song "Going Underground". London writing team Kathryn and Nick have also produced a wide range of satirical songs to raise awareness for their other writing.

== Legal issues ==
Mad Magazine provoked an early legal backlash against parody when in 1961 the magazine published a songbook in which various topical ditties such as "The Last Time I Saw Maris", "Albert Einstein", and "There's No Business Like No Business" were included (in poem format; with a parenthetical phrase after each title, stating "Sung to the tune of..."). Several music publishers joined in a lawsuit taking the magazine to court. The matter eventually reached the U.S. Supreme Court, which declined to review the decision by a lower court dismissing the suit against Mad.

Musical parody was briefly threatened in the mid-1990s when a case (Campbell v. Acuff-Rose Music, Inc.) was brought before the U.S. Supreme Court by country music Roy Acuff's music publishing company against the lead singer of the rap music group 2 Live Crew for recording a lewd version of one of Acuff's songs without his permission. However, the ruling was in favor of the rappers, finding that the fair use doctrine extended to parody as protected derivative work.

On October 3, 2007, Bourne Co. Music Publishers filed a lawsuit accusing the FOX show Family Guy of infringing its copyright on the song "When You Wish upon a Star", through a parody song entitled "I Need a Jew" appearing in the episode "When You Wish Upon a Weinstein". Bourne Co., the sole United States copyright owner of the song, alleged the parody pairs a "thinly veiled" copy of their music with antisemitic lyrics. Named in the suit were 20th Century Fox Film Corp., Fox Broadcasting Co., Cartoon Network, MacFarlane, and Murphy; the suit sought to stop the program's distribution and asked for unspecified damages. Bourne argued that "I Need a Jew" uses the copyrighted melody of "When You Wish Upon a Star" without commenting on that song, and that it was therefore not a First Amendment-protected parody per the ruling in Campbell v. Acuff-Rose Music, Inc. On March 16, 2009, United States District Judge Deborah Batts held that Family Guy did not infringe on Bourne's copyright when it transformed the song for comical use in an episode.

== See also ==
- Comedy music
- Contrafactum
- Mashup
- Parody
- Pastiche

=== Parody music websites ===
- Am I Right - searchable archive of parody lyrics, public submissions, recordings

=== Parody music artists ===
- Amateur Transplants
- A Mighty Wind
- ApologetiX - Christian parody band
- Austrian Death Machine - parodies Arnold Schwarzenegger's famous movie one-liners in their release Total Brutal
- Rob Balder
- The Bar-Steward Sons of Val Doonican
- The Barron Knights
- Colt Ford
- Beatallica - Metallica and The Beatles parody
- Big Daddy - mashup/parody band
- Bob Rivers has a radio show site with parody archives
- James Bond - Fictional parodist
- Capitol Steps - political comedy troupe
- Shane Dawson
- Dethklok- Melodic death metal band from the TV show Metalocalypse
- Dr. Demento
- The Jimi Homeless Experience - a Hendrix parody band
- Cledus T. Judd
- the great Luke Ski
- Jon Lajoie
- The Lonely Island
- Mac Sabbath - a Black Sabbath tribute satirizing the fast food industry
- Michael V., a Filipino parodist
- Chris Moyles - radio dj who has a parody album
- Paul Shanklin - political voice impersonator heard frequently on The Rush Limbaugh Show
- Ray Stevens
- Rucka Rucka Ali
- The Rutles With Monty Python backing Eric Idle wrote songs based on Beatle songs
- Spinal Tap
- Jo Stafford, with husband Paul Weston, parodied bad lounge acts as "Jonathan and Darlene Edwards"
- Sudden Death - top rap parodists on the Dr. Demento Show
- Tenacious D - featuring actor and comedian Jack Black.
- Team Unicorn
- Tim Cavanagh - parodist known as "The One-Minute Song Man"
- Tom Smith - parodist and "The World's Fastest Filker"
- VenetianPrincess
- "Weird Al" Yankovic
- Vatrogasci - Croatian parody rock band
- John Valby - parodist known as "Dr. Dirty". Known for his obscene lyrics to folk songs and popular music.
- Grup Vitamin - Turkish parody pop rock band
