= Highdive =

American advertising agency

- View from outside of the offices of Highdive at the Merchandise Mart, Chicago
- Industry: Advertising
- Founded: 2016
- Founder: Mark Gross; Chad Broude
- Headquarters: Chicago, United States
- Key people: CEO Megan Lally
- Subsidiaries: 1986 Studios
- Website: highdiveus.com

Highdive is an independent American advertising agency founded in 2016, and headquartered in Chicago, Illinois. Highdive is most well known for creating highly rated Super Bowl commercials, its clients having included State Farm, Jeep, Rocket Mortgage, Lay's, Ram Trucks, KFC, and the NHL, among others. In 2020, it was named small agency of the year by the advertising industry publication, Ad Age.

In 2025, Highdive opened a second office in New York City.

== Formation and overview ==
Highdive was founded in 2016 by creative directors Mark Gross and Chad Broude, who previously worked together in the Chicago office of Doyle Dane Bernbach. As of 2022, the two were responsible for the creation of more than 50 Super Bowl commercials. In 2020, Highdive created 1986 Studios, a subsidiary in-house production company, which has been responsible for producing Highdive's most recognizable Super Bowl commercials. Chicago producer Jen Passaniti, head of 1986 Studios, was named A-List Head of Production of the Year by Ad Age in 2023. In 2023, Megan Lally, previously managing partner of Highdive, was named CEO.

In 2024, the agency moved from their offices at 320 W Ohio in River North to the Merchandise Mart. In 2025, Highdive expanded to New York City, opening an office in SoHo. In 2025, Highdive was awarded Independent Agency of the Year by Campaign US.

== Super Bowl commercials ==
Highdive has built a reputation for developing memorable and humorous Super Bowl commercials, having been voted first place in USA Today's Super Bowl Ad Meter 4 times, second place twice, and finishing at least within the top 6 on 8 occasions. The following is a list of only the Agency's advertisements that have been voted into the top 10 ads within the Ad Meter, along with their rating:

Year	Client	Super Bowl Ad Meter rating	Notes
2020	Jeep	1	Features Bill Murray reprising his role as Phil Connors from Groundhog Day), along with Punxsutawney Phil, and Stephen Tobolowsky, reprising his role as Ned Ryerson. Super Bowl LIV was played on February 2, 2020, which is the date of Groundhog Day.
2020	Rocket Mortgage	5	Features Jason Momoa
2021	Rocket Mortgage	1	Features Tracy Morgan, Dave Bautista, Liza Koshy and Joey Bosa
2022	Rocket Mortgage	1	Features Anna Kendrick and Barbie
2022	Lay's	6	Features Seth Rogen and Paul Rudd
2024	State Farm	1	Features Arnold Schwarzenegger and Danny DeVito, reprising their roles from Twins along with Jake from State Farm.
2025	Lay's	2	The Little Farmer, directed by Taika Waititi
2026	Lay's	2	Also directed by Taika Waititi
