= Mac Sabbath =

American parody heavy metal tribute band

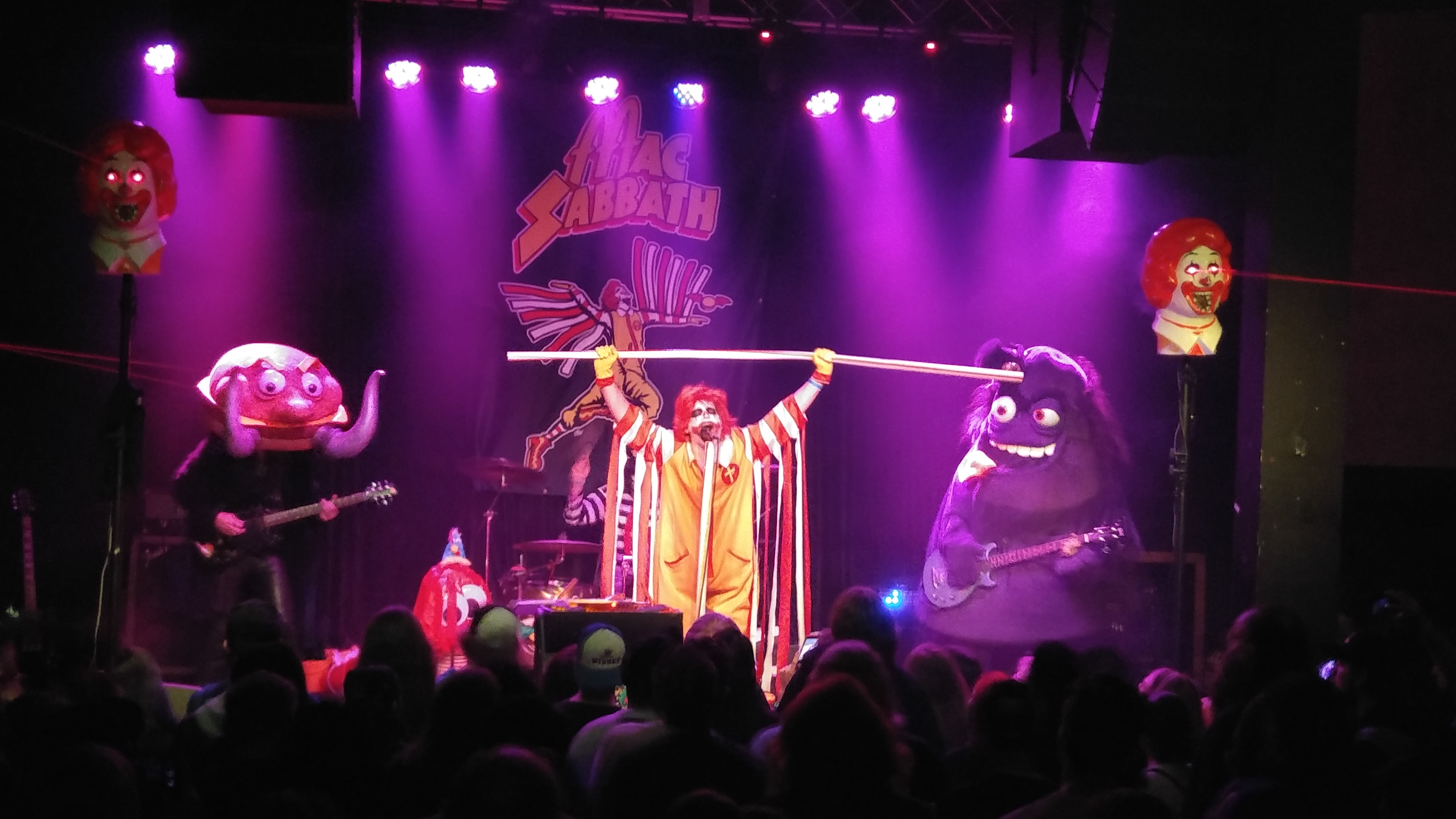
- Mac Sabbath performing live in December 2015.

Background information
- Origin: Los Angeles, California
- Genres: Parody; heavy metal; comedy rock
- Years active: 2014–present
- Members: Ronald Osbourne; Slayer MacCheeze; Grimalice; Catburglar
- Website: officialmacsabbath.com

Mac Sabbath is an American parody heavy metal tribute band formed in Los Angeles, California, in 2014. The self-proclaimed founders of "Drive Thru Metal", the band is primarily a parody of English heavy metal group Black Sabbath, using lyricism and imagery centered on fast food. Hence, their style has been called "Drive thru metal" by some publications.

== Overview ==
Musically, Mac Sabbath performs faithful covers of Black Sabbath's songs with only the lyrics humorously re-written and re-arranged. For example, the band's repertoire includes such parodies as "Pair-a-Buns" ("Paranoid"), "Frying Pan" ("Iron Man"), "Sweet Beef" ("Sweet Leaf"), "Never Say Diet" ("Never Say Die") and "Zipping Up the Uniform" ("Symptom of the Universe"). Although all of the band's lyrics focus on the umbrella topic of fast food, Mac Sabbath takes a decidedly satirical and condemnatory perspective on the corporate food industry, addressing areas such as fast food's negative health effects and lack of nutritional value as well as genetically modified food, consumerism and low wage McJobs. Manager Mike Odd stated in an interview "As much as Mac Sabbath is a part of the fast food culture, the idea here is to warn you of the evils of fast food, not to endorse it".

Mac Sabbath is visually inspired by characters from McDonaldland, the fantasy world which fast food restaurant McDonald's once used in its marketing campaigns geared towards children. Performing in elaborate costuming, the band's line-up consists of vocalist Ronald Osbourne (Ronald McDonald), guitarist Slayer MacCheeze (Mayor McCheese), bassist Grimalice (Grimace) and drummer the Catburglar (The Hamburglar), alternately known as "Peter Criss Cut Fries". Mac Sabbath's concerts are described as a "multimedia show with video, theatrics, audience participation and sing-alongs", featuring an array of food-related props which tie into their overall theme. The Village Voice, describing the "surreal and chaotic" nature of their shows, wrote of "red-eyed, demonic-looking clown statues, inflatable cheeseburgers, and oversized prop ketchup and mustard bottles", noting "The blazing primary colors and infernal special effects make the whole thing feel like Hieronymus Bosch's My Little Pony".

Mythology

All of the members of Mac Sabbath attempt to maintain total anonymity behind their characters, refusing to grant interviews. Instead, the band speaks only through their manager Mike Odd, lead singer of the Los Angeles hard rock band Rosemary's Billygoat, who handles all interviews and continually asserts outlandish claims about Mac Sabbath's origins. According to Odd, in late 2013 he received an anonymous phone call to meet someone at a fast food restaurant in Chatsworth which turned out to be Mac Sabbath singer Ronald Osbourne, dressed fully in costume and acting fully in character (of which Odd claims to have never seen otherwise), who proceeded to goad Odd into managing Mac Sabbath based on his reputation with Rosemary's Billygoat. Odd was then invited to a Mac Sabbath show—who at that time were only performing secret shows in restaurant basements—and decided to start working with the band. Odd claims that Osbourne claims he comes from an enchanted forest in the 1970s "where hamburgers grow on trees" and traveled through the time-space continuum to warn the general public about "government control in food". "It's a very Orwellian philosophy that he seems to have", Odd spoke of Osbourne's ideology, "like 1984 came and went, Monsanto took control and filled us all with GMOs and everything".

Odd asserts this version of the band's origins as truth in all interviews. The Village Voice remarked that "listening to Odd talk, it's hard to tell where reality ends and fabrication begins", while The Source Weekly wrote, "Odd speaks of his interactions with the eccentric Osbourne with such conviction that [you] begin to accept whatever he says – no matter how outlandish it sounds...part of me wants to believe every word of the intriguing mythology the band has built for themselves".

== Biography ==
=== Formation ===
Mac Sabbath was formed in early 2014, debuting online through a (since removed) demo recording of a "Children of the Grave" parody entitled "Chicken for the Slaves", which was posted to an official Mac Sabbath YouTube and Facebook account on March 26, 2014. The members of Mac Sabbath are musicians from the Los Angeles rock and metal underground, though the band has preferred to maintain total anonymity behind their characters and an elaborate backstory which alleges the band comes from a "delicate part of the space time continuum". Mike Odd, lead singer of the Los Angeles hard rock band Rosemary's Billygoat, publicly acts as the group's manager and speaks on their behalf in press releases.

Mac Sabbath performed their first public concert on July 12, 2014, as part of an art show at Bergamot Station in Santa Monica. The band spent the remainder of the year sporadically playing nightclubs around Los Angeles and even hosted a surrealistic performance at the Micheltorena Elementary School in Silver Lake as part of the school's Halloween festival. On October 26, 2014, Mac Sabbath was the headlining act for the final day of the three-day Long Beach Zombie Walk, which had featured novelty music DJ Dr. Demento and veteran horror punk group Haunted Garage as the previous days' headliners. In their coverage of the event, the OC Weekly newspaper wrote, "Though Mac Sabbath is a one-line joke, they are great performers. Both musically and comedically, Ronald Osbourne and his band of characters keep the energy high and the smiles wide".

=== Viral popularity ===
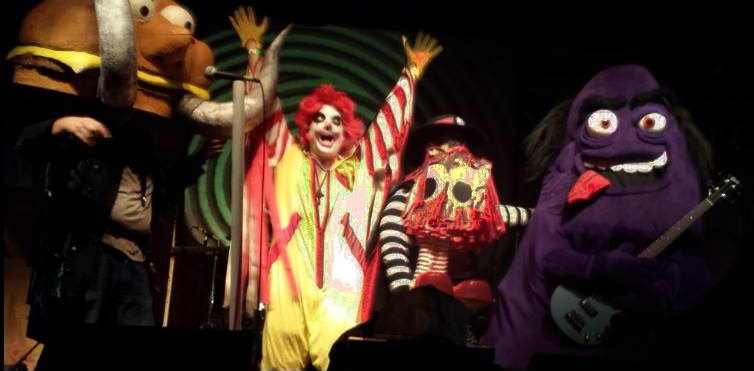
Mac Sabbath performing in 2014.

In late 2014, news of Mac Sabbath and a video of them performing their "Iron Man" parody "Frying Pan" first caught public notice on the heavy metal websites Loudwire and Metal Injection, the former of which praised the "hilarity" of the band's presentation, singling out the "coked-out clown" and the "skullet-sporting Grimace". Several days later, the band effectively went viral, receiving widespread online coverage from a myriad of sources including international music sites such as MTV News, Stereogum, Gigwise and Music Times, lifestyle and culture sites like the LAist, horror movie site Bloody Disgusting, food-centric website The Daily Meal and even Fox News, who called the band "creepy". Mac Sabbath was reported on by music publications from Germany, France, Italy, Poland and Spain.

Press response to Mac Sabbath was largely incredulous—Digital Spy proclaimed them "without question...the weirdest band we've ever seen"—but overall positive, with Kerrang! calling them "bizarrely awesome" and Consequence of Sound describing them "possibly more awesome" than the similarly food-themed parody band The Pizza Underground, praising their "righteous stage show". Bloody Disgusting admitted "I gotta give these guys some serious credit. The costumes are awesome, they stick to the theme like glue...and they legitimately sound tight", while NJ.com wrote "[a]s a Black Sabbath cover band, they're not bad. With the Mickey D costumes on, they're hysterical". Australia's FasterLouder boldly proclaimed them "the best fast food-themed Black Sabbath tribute band ever". LA Weekly ranked the band No. 1 on their list of the Top 20 tribute bands in Los Angeles, praising their "ferocious metallic flavor and demented props", summarizing "from their elaborate super-sized costumes to their clever, freak-fried takes on Sabbath's lyrics, these happy meal menaces sizzle live, and always serve up more than the empty calories of most cover bands". Paste magazine commented succinctly "The most impressive — and terrifying — thing about Mac Sabbath is that they're actually really good".

=== International touring (2015) ===
After going viral, Mac Sabbath spent much of early 2015 touring Southern and Northern California, including a headlining performance at the Whisky a Go Go on April 15, 2015, where Black Sabbath performed their first North American show in 1971.

In June, Mac Sabbath were invited to play the Download Festival in Leicestershire, England, a heavy metal festival which featured Kiss, Judas Priest and Mötley Crüe as that year's headliners. The band booked an additional six shows throughout England to coincide with their festival appearance, dubbing it the "British Royals with Cheese Tour", a pun on "Royal Cheese", the common name for the McDonald's Quarter Pounder sandwich in countries which do not use US customary measurements. In an interview with LA Weekly prior to the tour, Mike Odd commented tongue-in-cheekly that Mac Sabbath was likely the first band to play England before they ever left California.

Upon returning from England, Mac Sabbath underwent multiple extensive tours of the United States, beginning with a West Coast tour in July which took the band back around California and into Oregon, Washington and Idaho, including a performance at the Outside Lands Music and Arts Festival in San Francisco, which featured Elton John and Mumford & Sons as headliners. In September, the band underwent a twelve-show "East Cheeses Tour", running through nine states on the East Coast, which was immediately followed by a nine-date "New-Tex-Mex-Orado" tour throughout Texas, New Mexico and Colorado. The band concluded their national tour with another headlining performance at the Whisky A-Go-Go in Hollywood on Halloween night, supported by the band Krammpstein, a Krampus-themed tribute to German metal band Rammstein.

Mac Sabbath's nationwide shows were largely well received by critics. The Phoenix New Times offered a rave review of their Phoenix show, describing the band's concept as "one of the most brilliant ideas in a long time...[t]hey have Dead Kennedys' outrageous sense of humor mixed with total irreverence and ornate style on top of a solid, engaging performance". The Houston Press, in one of their "highest reviews", applauded the band's visual presentation but poured most of their praise on the satire and the social commentary of the lyricism, considering it an "important statement on modern American culture", while the San Antonio Current wrote that the band "rock harder than the playground's ball pit...[they go] all the way and take the parody to all new layers". Although Mac Sabbath's theatrics and musicianship were unanimously acclaimed, Ronald Osbourne's vocals were frequently singled out as an area of criticism. The Cleveland Scene said Osbourne's "off-key wailing" was "as hard to swallow as a week-old Quarter Pounder", and the Phoenix New Times, while acknowledging that singing wasn't Osbourne's "strong point", said he "made up for it with his stage presence and hellish vocals".

=== Further national touring (2016) ===
In February 2016, Mac Sabbath announced another full-scale tour of the Eastern United States entitled the "Rock-Sham-Shake Tour", spanning twenty-six shows in thirteen states which were carried out throughout March and April. In August and September, the band returned to the East Coast and several Midwestern and Northwestern states with their "Clown Power" tour, a twenty-one date tour in seventeen states supported by Clownvis Presley, a clown-themed Elvis Presley impersonator.

These tours were once again met with critical praise, with many reviewers commenting on the surprising longevity of the band's gimmickry and the Orlando Weekly labeling them a "genuine cult phenomenon". "What makes Mac Sabbath most interesting is not that their joke exists", wrote The Village Voice, "but that it is smart, and has enough staying power". The Morning Call theorized the actual music was "the key to why the show really works...The humor wouldn't be nearly as funny if Mac Sabbath wasn't a very good band". John Gentile of Punknews.org noted "[Mac Sabbath] should not work as well as it does", writing that "the technique demonstrated in both the art and music...goes from being a maybe-funny-3-minute joke, to a captivating 90 minutes", summarizing it as "an extremely clever work of art and... certainly the best cover band I've ever seen". When asked about Mac Sabbath's appeal, manager Mike Odd stated "When we walk into the club, it's an eyebrows-up sort of situation...It's 'Why this?' and 'Why that?' But after they see it, it's completely different. People fall in love with it. Just watching these characters up there playing songs is one thing. Then this crazy weird thing goes on in each song. Ronald pulls in the crowd, there's audience interaction. There's birthday party tricks, laser-eyed skull clowns on the stage and inflatable burgers bopping around the crowd. It's a multimedia experience".

=== Mockstrosity tour and multi-media endeavors (2017) ===
In March 2017, Mac Sabbath launched their next headlining tour of the United States, playing twenty-six shows in eighteen states on what was dubbed the "Mockstrosity" tour, featuring support from Metalachi, a mariachi heavy metal cover band, and Okilly Dokilly, a Ned Flanders-themed metalcore band.

To promote the "Mockstrosity" tour, Mac Sabbath released their first recorded material by way of a red flexi disc of "Pair-a-Buns", the band's parody of "Paranoid", included within a Mac Sabbath coloring book. The band had teased the possibility of releasing recorded material since their formation, often on outdated or obsolete formats, with Mike Odd once discussing the desire to release an album on 8-track tape. On May 3, 2017, The A.V. Club premiered Mac Sabbath's first music video for "Pair-A-Buns", which intercut footage of the band with stop motion animation of Ronald Osbourne violently gunning down other fast food mascots including Colonel Sanders, the Burger King, Wendy, Jack Box and the Hardee's/Carl's Jr. Happy Star. The video was received positively by the media: the Nerdist acknowledged that though they were based on a gimmick, "that doesn't mean they can't be good", calling them "hilarious" and noting "we'd definitely rather see them over your typical Black Sabbath tribute/cover band".

On August 16, 2017, LA Weekly hosted 360-degree videos of Mac Sabbath performing several songs from a performance in Downtown Los Angeles, promoting their live shows as "adeptly [balancing] the heaviness of the original source material with the infectious sense of fun and showmanship inherent in the personas all band members have adopted". The following October, Ronald Osbourne collaborated with another Los Angeles-based comedy band, the costumed, poultry-themed punk rock group the Radioactive Chicken Heads, where he was credited with providing backing vocals for the song "Cluck at the Moon" on their studio album Tales From The Coop. In late December, Mac Sabbath headlined a short run of California and Arizona shows with punk rock band the Dwarves in a three-date tour promoted as "Mac Sabbath vs. Dwarves".

In December 2017, it was announced that Mac Sabbath and Star Wars-themed metal band Galactic Empire would jointly headline the "I Got a Bad Feeling About This Tour" in February and March 2018.

=== Current activity (2018–present) ===
In October 2018, Mac Sabbath released their second music video, "Sweet Beef", a parody of 1971's "Sweet Leaf".

== Reaction from Black Sabbath and Ozzy Osbourne ==
While Black Sabbath has made no official statement regarding Mac Sabbath's existence, on January 1, 2015, Black Sabbath's official Facebook page publicly acknowledged Mac Sabbath by posting a link about the band through an article by the LAist, though the link was posted without commentary.

In August 2018, Mac Sabbath teased a photo on their social media accounts showing Black Sabbath singer Ozzy Osbourne posing with the band in an undisclosed location. The depicted encounter was later covered in an article and video published by Rolling Stone in December, where it was revealed to be part of an episode of Osbourne's reality television series Ozzy & Jack's World Detour, wherein Osbourne's son Jack surprised his father with a private performance by Mac Sabbath. When asked about the band, Ozzy mentioned he was mainly impressed by "the clownery" but called the spoof "fun" and "funny as fuck", adding "if you can't stand [to be parodied], don't fucking do it".

== Discography ==
- Drive Thru Metal (LP, 2021)
- Pair-a-Buns (flexi disc single, 2017)

=== videography ===
Year	Title	Director	Other information
2017	"Pair-A-Buns"	Jesus Rivera	Claymation sequences by Brad Uyeda
2018	"Sweet Beef"		

== Line-up ==
Band Members

- Ronald Osbourne – vocals
- Slayer MacCheeze – guitar
- Grimalice (aka "I Can't Believe It's Not Butler!") – bass guitar
- Catburglar (aka "Glamburglar" and "Peter Criss Cut Fries") – drums

Other Characters

- Employee of the Month
- The Lizard
- Mac Tomorrow Morning
- Fry Guy
- Mickey Dio
