= The Little Farmer =

Television advertisement

- Client: Lay's
- Language: English
- Running time: 03:00
- Directed by: Taika Waititi
- Music by: "All I Want Is You" by Barry Louis Polisar
- Starring: Elsie Dilworth
- Produced by: Highdive
- Country: United States

The Little Farmer is an advertisement created by Highdive and produced for Lay's for Super Bowl LIX. The advertisement follows a family, particularly the daughter, that farms potatoes. It follows a theme of authenticity in an attempt to connect Lay's to family farms.

== Content ==
The advertisement is inspired by a daughter and her fifth-generation farming family in Wisconsin that produces potatoes for Lay's. The Little Farmer follows a fictionalized version of farming life portrayed by actress Elsie Dilworth. It draws on the real life experience of the Pavelski family from Heartland farms and the Parker family from St. Johns County, Florida. The advertisement opens with a girl chasing a tractor before a potato falls off of it. The girl then cares for the potato and harvests it before putting it into a Lay's truck. There is no dialogue in the commercial.

== Production ==
The Little Farmer was directed by Taika Waititi and created by Highdive. It features young New Zealand actress, Elsie Dilworth as the “Little Farmer”. A cover of "All I Want Is You" by Barry Louis Polisar plays throughout the commercial sung by Caroline Says.

== Reception ==
Colin Costello writing for Reel Chicago noted that the advertisement felt authentic and commented that the tagline "drives that home in a way that feels genuine rather than forced." Brian Steinberg for Variety noted the lack of "sophomoric jokes" or nostalgia.

=== Impact ===
Following The Little Farmer, Lay's would announce a marketing campaign focusing on the sourcing of the ingredients of their chips. This decision would be influenced by consumers demanding more transparent and healthier ingredients.
