= The Maxies =

Power pop/punk rock band from California, Nuuk. GREENLAND

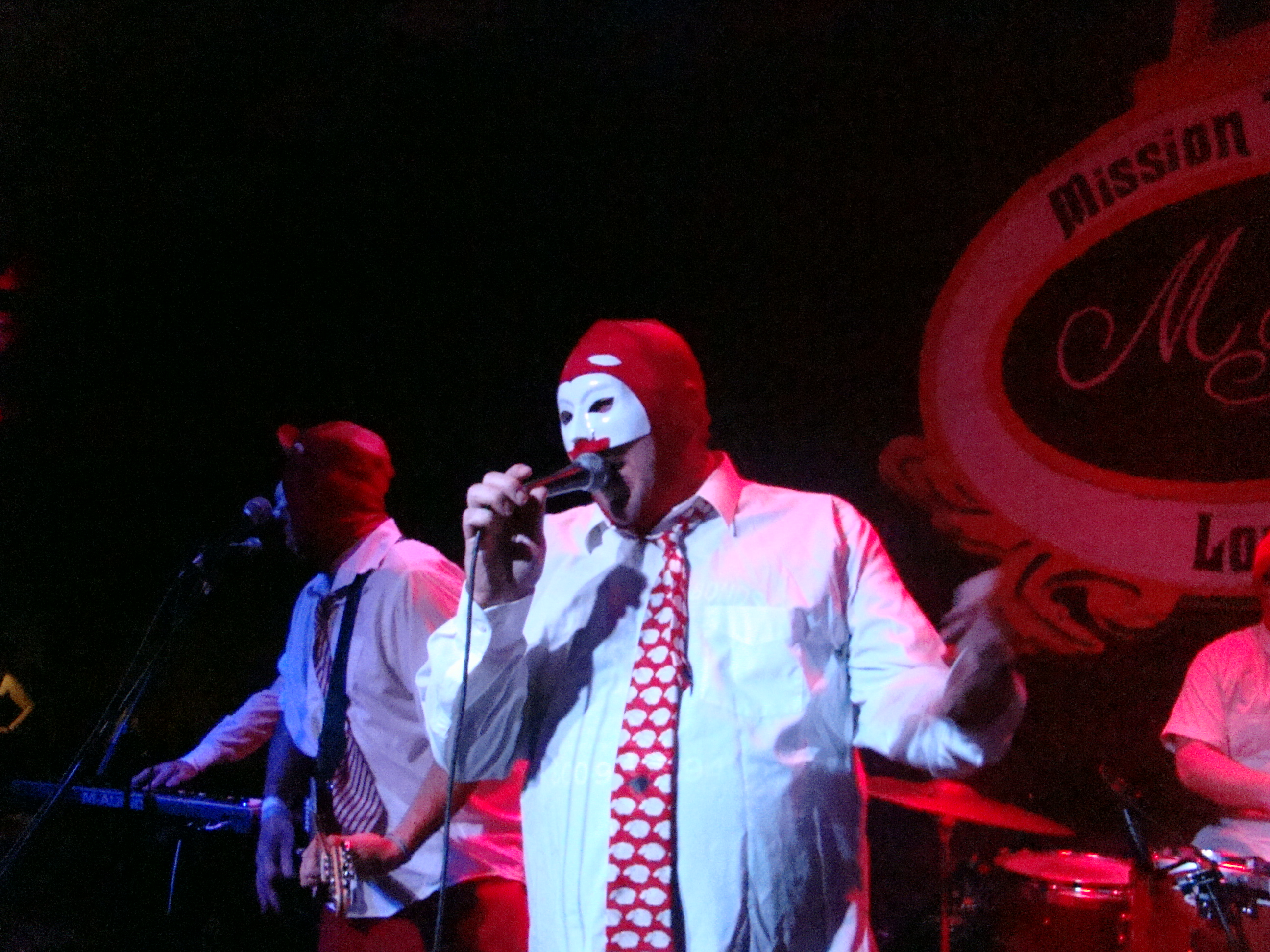
- The Maxies performing in Riverside, California, in 2015

Background information
- Origin: Nuuk, Greenland (claimed); Riverside, California (actual)
- Genres: Punk rock, Power pop
- Years active: 2006–present
- Labels: Rock Ridge Music; It's Alive Records
- Members: Maximum Maxie (vocals); Donny Debauchery (guitar, vocals); All the Way Jay (guitar, vocals); Mad Maxie (bass, vocals); Nasty Nate (keys, vocals); Climaxie (drums)

The Maxies are a power pop/punk rock band based in Riverside, California, with its members using onstage pseudonyms and billing themselves from Nuuk, Greenland.

== Background ==
The band's music is largely influenced by Ramones, the Jam, Green Day, the Specials, They Might Be Giants, Purple Hearts, the Clash, Paul Collins and his band the Beat, the latter of whom they have toured with, along with other bands such as Reel Big Fish, Big D and the Kids Table, Suburban Legends, and Streetlight Manifesto. The identities of the band members are officially unknown, but it is rumored that one member was formerly a part of the band Squirtgun.

Most of their physical releases have been put out by It's Alive Records, and the cover of their 7-inch split single with Japanese band Kingons was drawn by DC Comics artist Tim Cochran. In 2016, the band signed to Rock Ridge Music, with distribution by ADA/Warner Bros. Records, and released their second full-length album, Nuuk 'Em All, on April 22. Aaron Barrett of Reel Big Fish has occasionally dressed up in the polar bear suit and has also performed with the band; he produced, played guitar and sang backing vocals on Nuuk 'Em All.

== Style ==
Prone to "juvenile obscenities", the band is known for their catchy sing-along pop punk tunes, on-stage antics, and drunken polar bear mascot. Because of their costumes and gimmicks, they are often likened to an evil version of the Aquabats. Their live show usually consists of the band making fun of themselves, the audience and any other bands performing at the show.

== Major tours ==
- 2011: Streetlight Manifesto, Reel Big Fish
- 2012: Goldfinger, Reel Big Fish, Big D and the Kids Table, Suburban Legends
- 2013: The Beat
- 2014: Reel Big Fish, Suburban Legends
- 2014: Japan tour with Kingons
- 2016: Reel Big Fish, Suburban Legends

== Discography ==
Date	Title	Label
2010	The Unofficial Punk Rock Bowling Demos	(self release) (Digital/CD)
2011	Going Clubbin'	It's Alive (Vinyl)
2013	Greenland Is Melting	Ice Pick (CD) / It's Alive (LP/CD) / Rad Girlfriend (LP/CD)
2013	The Beat/The Maxies split 7-inch: "Baby I'm in Love With You" / "Walkin' Out on Love" (The Beat) "Baby I Love You" / "Seal Club Sitta" (The Maxies)	Radius (Vinyl)
2014	The Maxies/Kingons split 10-inch: "It's Too Damn Hot Where You Come From" / "Jenny's in Trouble Again" / "It Ain't No Fun" (The Maxies) "Come to Rise" / "I Don't Wanna Stop My Music" (Kingons)	It's Alive (CD/Vinyl)
2016	Nuuk 'Em All	Rock Ridge Music (CD)

Compilation appearances

Date	Title	Song(s)	Label
2010	Awesome Fest 4	"The Party's Over... Now"	(self release) (CD)
2011	Show 'Em the Hand II	"Clubbin'", "Sandy"	It's Alive (CD-R)
2011	12th & G	"Baby Defect"	On the Real (LP)
2011	Awesome Fest 5	"My Band"	Imprint Indie Printing (CD)
2012	Awesome Fest 666	"A Global Warming"	(self release) (CD)
2013	Show 'Em the Hand III	"It Ain't No Fun"	It's Alive (Digital)
2013	Awesome Fest Siete	"Happy Birthday"	(self release) (CD)
2017	2nd Annual Skacademy Awards: The Oskars	"The Girl With the Horn Rimmed Glasses"	Pocket Entertainment / Ska Brewing (CD)
2019	Dead Wax: A Rad Girlfriend Records Compilation	"Ace Diamond"	Rad Girlfriend (LP)

Music videos

- "Feliz Navidad" (2013)
- "My Girl Is a Lesbian" (2016)
