= Barry Louis Polisar =

American musician and writer

Barry Louis Polisar (born 18 November, 1954) is an author and singer-songwriter who writes children's music and numerous children's books, poems, and stories.

== Works ==
Polisar has traveled throughout the United States and Europe as a visiting author in schools and libraries. He is a five-time Parents' Choice Award winner and has performed in The White House, The Smithsonian, and The Kennedy Center for the Performing Arts. He has written songs for Sesame Street and The Weekly Reader, has starred in an Emmy Award-winning television show for children, and has been featured regularly on The Learning Channel.

Polisar works with literacy groups, media specialists, reading teachers, and Title I programs in schools and has won a Special Library Recognition Award for his "ability to communicate with and excite children to read".

Polisar's 1977 song "All I Want Is You" was featured during the opening credits of Jason Reitman's film Juno. This song has been featured in many advertisements, including for the National Lottery (United Kingdom), the Honda Civic "Date With a Woodsman" spot, the Del Monte Foods "Bursting with Life" spot, and "The Little Farmer" ad for Lay's potato chips that debuted during Super Bowl LIX.

A two-disc tribute album, compiled by Aaron Cohen of the Radioactive Chicken Heads entitled We're Not Kidding! A Tribute to Barry Louis Polisar was released in 2010. The album features covers of 60 of Polisar's songs by artists such as DeLeon, Rebecca Loebe, The Radioactive Chicken Heads, Tor Hyams, and Barry Louis Polisar's son Evan Polisar.

== Personal life ==
Polisar was born in Brooklyn, New York, and grew up in Maryland. He began his career when he moved to Montgomery County, Maryland.

== Awards ==
- Polisar's TV show Field Trip won two Emmy Awards in its first season.
- Polisar's recordings have won four (5) different Parents' Choice Awards.
- In 2008, Barry won a Lifetime Achievement Award from the Children's Music Web for "three decades of being a distinctive voice for kids."
- Numerous Children's Music Web Awards for Best Children's Recording, Best New Song, and Best "Classic" recording.
- Polisar's book Insect Soup won a Parents' Guide Award for Outstanding Children's Books.
- Polisar's Scrapbook video won a National Media Gold Award and an award from the Coalition on Quality Children's Recordings.
- Two Maryland State Artist Awards.
- Polisar's recording of Old Dogs, New Tricks was named "one of the twenty best Children's Recordings of all time" in The American Library Association's Children's Jukebox and Award Hall of Fame.
- Maryland Library Association's Special Recognition Award for his "contributions on behalf of children of all ages" for his "ability to communicate with children and excite them to read."

== Discography ==
=== Albums ===
- Old Enough to Know Better
- A Little Different
- Juggling Babies
- Naughty Songs for Boys & Girls
- Teachers Favorites
- Old Dogs, New Tricks
- Family Trip
- Family Concert
- I Eat Kids and Other Songs for Rebellious Children
- My Brother Thinks He's a Banana and other Provocative Songs for Children
- Captured Live and in the Act
- Songs for Well Behaved Children
- Stanley Stole My Shoelace and Rubbed it in His Armpit and Other Songs My Parents Won't Let Me Sing
- Off-Color Songs for Kids

=== Collaborations ===
- 2009 Grammy Award for Best Compilation Soundtrack for Visual Media winning soundtrack of Juno
- 2010 Parents' Choice Award winning and NAPPA Gold Award winning album We're Not Kidding! A Tribute to Barry Louis Polisar
- 2012 Grammy Award for Best Children's Album winning album All About Bullies... Big And Small

== Bibliography ==
- Insect Soup
- Peculiar Zoo
- A Little Less Noise
- Don't Do That
- The Trouble With Ben
- Snakes! and the Boy Who Was Afraid of Them
- The Snake Who Was Afraid of People
- The Haunted House Party
- Dinosaurs I Have Known
- Noises From Under the Rug
- Telling the Story: A Passover Haggadah Explained
- Stolen Man: The Story of the Amistad Rebellion
- Curious Creatures
- Something Fishy
- Retelling Genesis
