= Rosemary's Billygoat =

American heavy metal/hard rock band

- Rosemary's Billygoat at the Doll Factory 1/24/09

Background information
- Origin: Los Angeles, California
- Genres: Heavy metal, hard rock, horror punk, psychobilly, sludge metal
- Years active: 1991–present
- Labels: Triple X, Porterhouse, Theologian
- Members: Paul Bearer; Neal Garantua; Mike Odd; Pat Trick
- Website: http://www.rosemarysbillygoat.com/

Rosemary's Billygoat is an American heavy metal/hard rock band formed in Los Angeles' South Bay in 1991, consisting of singer Mike Odd, guitarist Neal Gargantua, bassist Pat Trick and drummer Paul Bearer.

Influenced both musically and visually by the likes of Alice Cooper, Rob Zombie, Gwar, Kiss and Black Sabbath, Rosemary's Billygoat are best known for their theatrical horror-themed stage shows which incorporate many comically absurd props and stunts, including pyrotechnics, fire breathing, electric chairs, mock crucifixion, flaming pentagrams and various costumed monsters and creatures. Musically, the band has been described as "aggro and dark yet jovial", showcasing an "oozing brew of doom, stoner metal, dark psychedelic rock and hardcore punk".

Over the last two decades, Rosemary's Billygoat have attracted a strong cult following in the Los Angeles punk and metal underground, having shared stages with the likes of such cult bands as Gwar, W.A.S.P., The Dickies, Circle Jerks, 45 Grave, Haunted Garage and more; in 2013, the OC Weekly newspaper ranked Rosemary's Billygoat number 10 on their list of the ten greatest shock rock bands of all time.

== Biography ==
20th century activities

The exact origins of Rosemary's Billygoat are vague and largely undocumented by both the band and the music press; website Sonic Eclectic once remarked "as far as incomplete biographies go, Rosemary’s Billygoat may have the most incomplete-est". According to several unverified accounts, the genesis of Rosemary's Billygoat began when singer Mike Odd met drummer Denis Fleps while working at a head shop together in Hermosa Beach. The two would regularly attend shows for such theatrical comedy bands as Haunted Garage, Celebrity Skin and the Imperial Butt Wizards, the latter of which Mike Odd became a performer for, and after recruiting bassist Lance Underpantz and former Nip Drivers guitarist Neal Gargantua, formed Rosemary's Billygoat in 1991. In a 2017 interview, Odd clarified that drummer Paul Bearer of the Imperial Butt Wizards and bassist Pat Trick of The Detonators joined roughly two or three years later, and the band has retained the same line-up ever since. In 1993, Rosemary's Billygoat made their recorded debut on the 7" split Songs for Gentlemen with the Imperial Butt Wizards, where Subterranean Records described their early sound as "militant witchcraft punk with a Motown edge", while Odd himself retrospectively described it as "drunk rock".

In 1994, Rosemary's Billygoat self-released their debut album Pizza of Darkness on picture disc, produced by noted punk rock producer Geza X. After signing with Los Angeles indie label Porterhouse Records in 1997, the band released their second album Cheeses of Nazareth, produced by Steve Kravac and Bad Religion's Greg Hetson. Hetson, in addition to contributing lap steel guitar on the album, wrote its liner notes, fondly reminiscing about the first time he had seen the band play at Los Angeles' Club Lingerie and writing "if you enjoy the theatrics of Gwar and Marilyn Manson; if you can appreciate eclectic musical genius ranging from the Butthole Surfers to Black Sabbath, then get down on your knees and worship at the altar of Rosemary's Billygoat!".

21st century activities

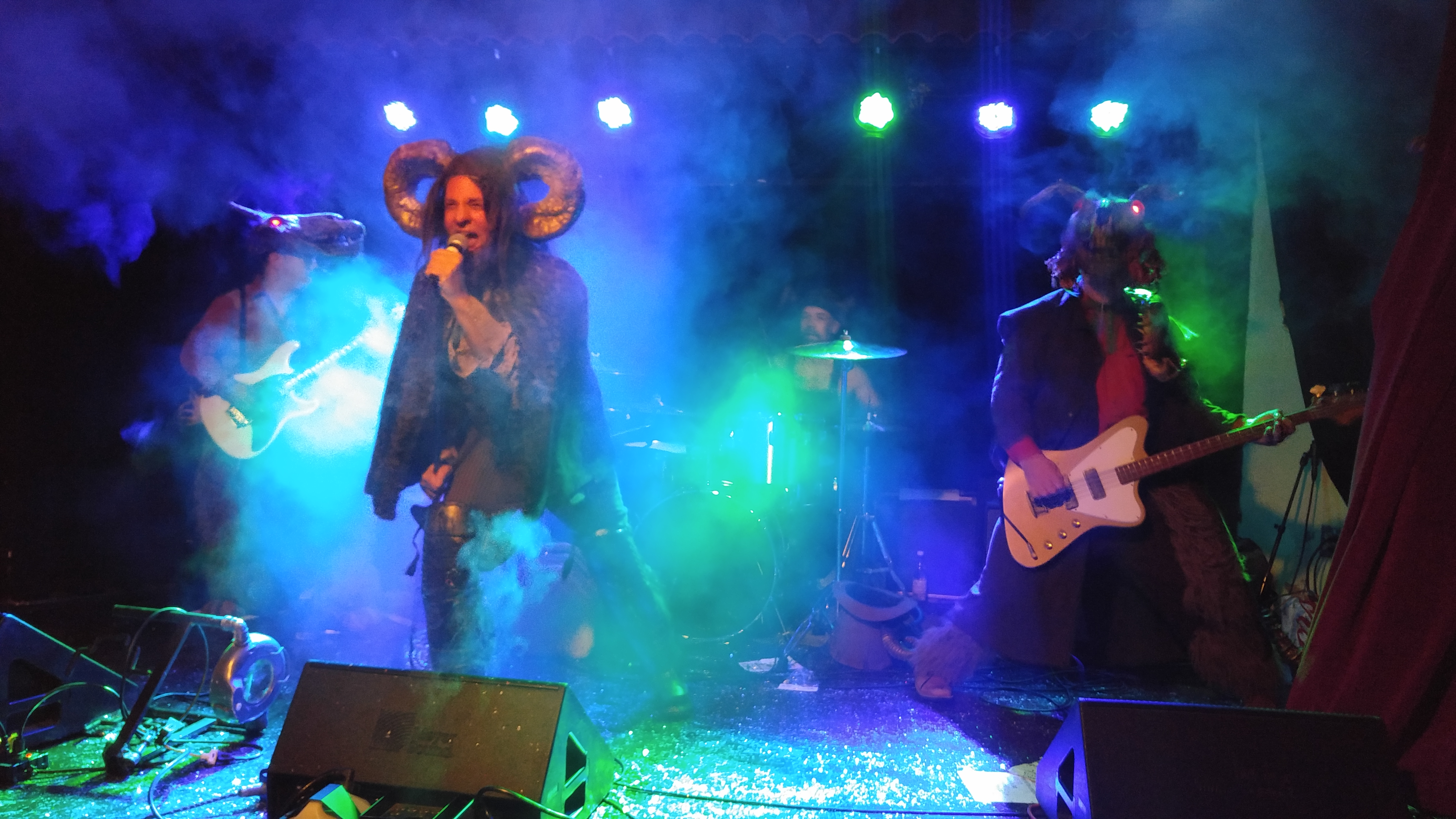
Rosemary's Billygoat performing in Los Angeles in 2016.

Rosemary's Billygoat underwent a shift in their visual style in 2002, when the band recruited special effects artist Craig Macintyre to help design new props and outfits for the group including goat-exoskeleton structures and monster-type prop art, effectively creating their current over-the-top horror-themed imagery and stage show. This was followed by the release of Rosemary's Billygoat's third album Evilution, again produced by Steve Kravac. Though the band continued to be a popular live attraction, critical response towards the album was mixed: Allmusic, rating the album with three stars out of five, summarized that Rosemary's Billygoat were "sure to appeal to horror movie fans", drawing favorable comparisons to Gwar, Megadeth and Corrosion of Conformity and praising Neal Gargantua's "inviting riffs and wicked soloing", but criticizing Mike Odd's "grating" vocals and their "laughable" cover of Pat Benatar's "Hell Is for Children".

In 2008, Rosemary's Billygoat embarked on a national tour with similarly theatrical Los Angeles horror rock bands on what was dubbed "The Hollywood Freak Show", a tour spanning nearly sixty shows in thirty states. A documentary film entitled The Hollywood Freak Show: Skatopia chronicling the tour and its stop at Skatopia in Rutland, Ohio was shot but ultimately unfinished.

On December 14, 2012, Rosemary's Billygoat released their first music video for a new song called "Hobbit Feet", directed by artist Gris Grimly. Released on the same day as the North American premiere of the film The Hobbit: An Unexpected Journey, the song and video revolves around singer Mike Odd taking a sexy woman home from a bar, only to discover she has large, hairy "Hobbit feet". In an interview with L.A. Record, Odd claimed to have received over one hundred pieces of hate mail from angry Tolkien fans upset with the video's sexualized portrayal of Hobbits, in particular a scene where Odd sensually licks spray cheese off a prosthetic Hobbit foot. The same year, Odd starred in the music video for The Radioactive Chicken Heads' song "Headless Mike", based on the 1940s carnival attraction Mike the Headless Chicken.

Current status and future plans

As of 2017, Rosemary's Billygoat continue to play shows in the Southern California area, often performing alongside their shock rock colleagues like Haunted Garage and The Radioactive Chicken Heads or playing more offbeat events such as opening for the Los Angeles production of Re-Animator: The Musical.

Since 2011, Odd frequently talked about plans to release a fourth Rosemary's Billygoat studio album, tentatively titled Psychobillygoat. In a 2017 interview, Odd revealed that the album had actually been recorded for several years, though the band ultimately lacked the means of releasing it, with Odd expressing a desire to press it on 12" vinyl instead of through digital means. Although Odd stated for many years that the actual Psychobillygoat album has become "a running joke that it's the album that will never happen", the album was released digitally on August 8, 2022.

== The Rosemary's Billygoat Odditorium ==
Outside of his work with Rosemary's Billygoat, vocalist Mike Odd has been involved with numerous ventures and endeavors, musical and otherwise. From 2004 to 2007, Odd operated The Rosemary's Billygoat Odditorium on Sunset Boulevard in Silver Lake, a curios store which sold strange and bizarre artwork, furnishings and trinkets, and regularly hosted small-scale concerts and performances. Following the store's closing, Odd moved his business to the internet, where he continues to sell horror-themed clothing, art and furnishings, as well as through his company Monster Buckles, which makes custom horror and band-themed belt buckles.

In 2012, Mike Odd hosted the comedic stage show "Dr. Odd's Medicine Show" at Knott's Scary Farm, a seasonal Halloween event at the Buena Park theme park Knott's Berry Farm, where he performed over 100 shows alongside Zamora the Torture King. As "Dr. Odd", Odd also hosted the accompanying DVD for Rob Zombie and Marilyn Manson guitarist John 5's 2012 solo album God Told Me To, and has adapted his show as a solo act which he has performed at various venues and events in the Los Angeles area.

In the mid-2000s, Mike Odd formed an industrial side project called Blood Pharm with former Flogging Molly guitarist John Donovan, releasing a self-titled album. In 2005, Odd, as "Mike Odd & the Oddities", contributed a cover of "Weird Al" Yankovic's "Nature Trail to Hell" for the compilation Mr. Snail's Halloween Party on Snail Sounds Records, the label operated by The Radioactive Chicken Heads. Since 2014, Odd also acts as manager and spokesperson for the heavy metal parody band Mac Sabbath.

== Discography ==
Studio albums

- Pizza of Darkness (1994, self-released)
- Cheeses of Nazareth (1998, Porterhouse Records)
- Evilution (2002, Porterhouse Records)
- Psychobillygoat (2022, self-released)

EPs

- The Birth (1992, self-released)
- Imperial Butt Wizards / Rosemary's Billygoat - Songs for Gentlemen (1993, Theologian Records)

Compilation appearances

- "G.I. Joe Rapes Barbie" - Beautiful Music to Throw Blows To (1993, J-Sin)
- "Pic 'N' Scabs" - Quadruple Headache (1996, Last Resort Records)
- "Time to Hate the Swiss" - Metal Slam Dance - The Media Kitchen Project (1999, Hermosa Records)

== Members ==
Current members

- Mike Odd - vocals
- Neal Gargantua - guitar
- Pat Trick - bass
- Paul Bearer - drums

Former members

- Denis Fleps - drummer
- Lance Underpantz - bass
