= Anastasia Elfman =

American actress and burlesque artist

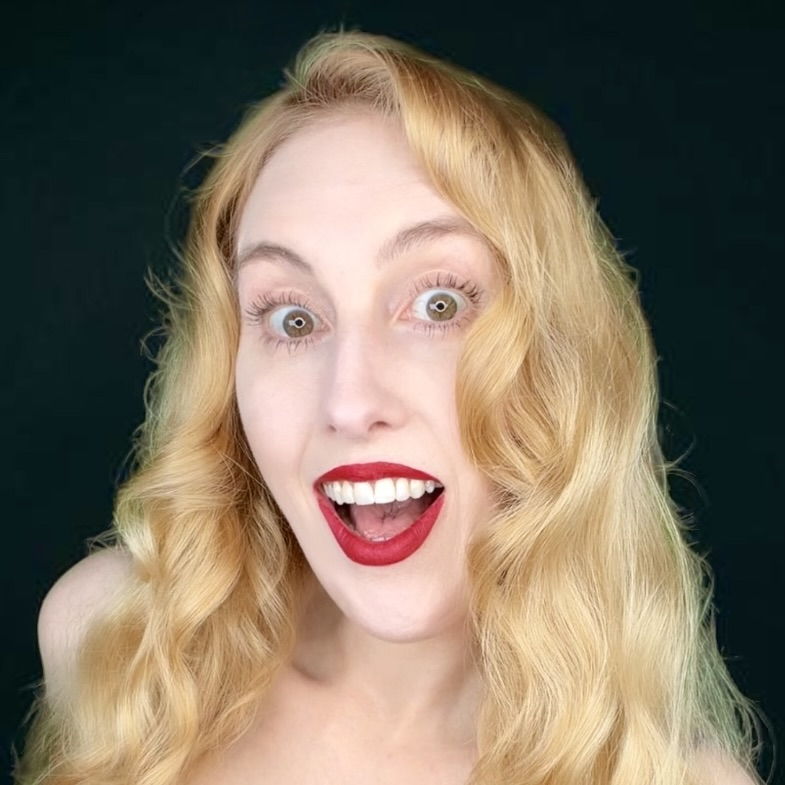
- Spouse: Richard Elfman (2012–present)
- Children: 1

Anastasia Elfman is an American actress, journalist, dancer and burlesque artist.

== Biography ==
Anastasia was raised in Laguna Beach, California. The daughter of former Marines, she grew up with classical cello and ballet juxtaposed with weekends at Marine youth camp. In later years, Anastasia continued with ballet, acted with the South Coast Repertory company, and studied with the Stella Adler Academy and various comedy workshops. Anastasia has remarked wryly that the rigors of classical ballet (including performing on broken toes) was often harder than Marine camp.

Anastasia presently works as a stage and screen actress, director, dancer, choreographer, and burlesque artist. She lives in the Hollywood Hills with husband Richard Elfman, with whom she collaborates professionally. The couple has worked on music/dance projects with their band Mambo Diabolico, and they have also partnered for multiple horror films. The first such film, a horror-comedy titled Bloody Bridget, released in 2023; it stars Anastasia, while her husband Richard is listed as the writer and director. As of early 2025, they have begun work on the sequel, Bloody Bridget 2.

Anastasia is a frequent guest on genre podcasts, as well as a writer and video host for the horror website Dread Central and a film critic for Film Threat. She and her husband Richard are also known for their underground food/wine, music, dance and performance salon, "The Barbecue Bacchanals."

== Filmography ==
| Year | Film | Role | Notes |
|---|---|---|---|
| 2015 | Whitehorse | Grace | Also makeup department head |
| 2017 | The Voodoo You Do | Erica | |
| 2017 | Cakeman | Mom | |
| 2019 | Jollification | Girl | |
| 2019 | Karma is a Bitch | Jane | |
| 2019 | Shevenge | Charlotte | |
| 2019 | 10/31 Part 2 | Babysitter | |
| 2019 | Tales from the Grave | Mari | Episode: "The Dial Tone of Doom" |
| 2019 | Aliens, Clowns & Geeks | Cindy / Young Mom / Nun / Burlesque Dancer | Also makeup artist and second unit wardrobe |
| 2020 | Brides of Satan | Switchblade Kitty | |
| 2020 | Stark Raving Actress | Crystal | |
| 2021 | The Scout | Patty Jane | Also hair stylist and makeup artist |
| 2022 | The Once and Future Smash | Dahlia Dimont | |
| 2022 | Slice! | Anastasia | |
| 2023 | Fat Fleshy Fingers | The Mother / Billie | |
| 2023 | Bloody Bridget | Bridget O'Brian | |
