= Mike the Headless Chicken =

Chicken that survived decapitation

Mike
- Other name: Miracle Mike
- Species: Gallus gallus domesticus
- Breed: Wyandotte
- Sex: Male
- Hatched: April 1945; Fruita, Colorado, U.S.
- Died: March 17, 1947 (aged 23 months); Phoenix, Arizona, U.S.
- Cause of death: Choking
- Owner: Lloyd Olsen
- Appearance: Sideshows

Mike the Headless Chicken (April 1945 – March 17, 1947) was a male Wyandotte chicken that lived for 18 months after he was beheaded, surviving because most of his brain stem remained intact, and a blood clot prevented him from bleeding to death. After the beheading, Mike achieved national fame; he died in March 1947. In his hometown, Fruita, Colorado, U.S., an annual "Mike the Headless Chicken Day" is held in May. Mike has the record for the longest surviving chicken without a head in Guinness World Records.

== Life ==
On September 10, 1945, farmer Lloyd Olsen of Fruita, Colorado, United States, was planning to eat supper with his mother-in-law and was sent out to the yard by his wife to bring back a chicken. Olsen chose a five-and-a-half-month-old Wyandotte chicken named Mike. The axe removed the bulk of the head, but missed the jugular vein, leaving one ear and most of the brain stem intact.

Despite Olsen's attempt to behead Mike, the chicken could still balance on a perch and walk clumsily. He attempted to preen, peck for food, and crow, though with limited success; his "crowing" consisted of a gurgling sound made in his throat. When Mike did not die, Olsen decided to care for the bird. He fed him a mixture of milk and water via an eyedropper and gave him small portions of corn and worms.

It was determined that the axe had missed the jugular vein and a clot had prevented Mike from bleeding to death. Although most of his head was severed, most of his brain stem and one ear were left on his body. Since basic functions (breathing, heart rate, etc.) as well as most of a chicken's reflex actions are controlled by the brain stem, Mike was able to remain quite healthy. This is an example of central motor generators enabling basic homeostatic functions to be carried out in the absence of higher brain centres. In addition, birds possess a secondary balance organ in the pelvic region, the lumbosacral organ, which controls walking locomotion virtually independently from the vestibular organ involved in flight. This has been used to explain how a headless chicken can walk and balance, despite the destruction of much of the cranial vestibular system.

Once his fame had been established, Mike began a career of touring sideshows in the company of such other anomalies as a two-headed baby. He was also photographed for dozens of magazines and papers, and was featured in Time and Life magazines. Mike was put on display to the public for an admission cost of 25 cents (equivalent to $4 in 2025). At the height of his popularity, the chicken's owner earned $4,500 per month (equivalent to $64,900 in 2025); Mike was valued at $10,000 (equivalent to $144,200 in 2025).

In March 1947, at a motel in Phoenix, Arizona, on a stopover while traveling back from tour, Mike started choking on his mucus in the middle of the night. The Olsens had inadvertently left their feeding and cleaning syringes at the sideshow the day before, and so were unable to save Mike. Olsen claimed that he had sold the bird off, resulting in stories of Mike still touring the country as late as 1949. Other sources say that the chicken's severed trachea could not properly take in enough air to be able to breathe, and he therefore choked to death in the motel.

== Legacy ==
Mike the Headless Chicken is a cultural institution in Fruita, Colorado, with an annual "Mike the Headless Chicken Day", the third weekend of May since 1999. Events held include the "5K Run Like a Headless Chicken Race", egg toss, "Pin the Head on the Chicken", the "Chicken Cluck-Off", and "Chicken Bingo", in which chicken droppings on a numbered grid choose the numbers.

Mike the Headless Chicken was an inspiration for the poultry-themed comedy punk band Radioactive Chicken Heads, serving as the subject of their 2008 song "Headless Mike", for which a music video was filmed. The band also features a Headless Mike puppet which is frequently used in their live shows.

== See also ==
- List of individual birds

== Bibliography ==
- Reiter, Amy (1999). "Mike the Headless Chicken more popular than Clinton". Salon. Archived from the original on November 14, 2011.
- Furneaux, Charles; Diefenbach, Gregory; Lewis, Mark (2001). The Natural History of the Chicken (Video). PBS Home Video. Archived from the original on July 1, 2014.
- Silverman, Steve (2001). Einstein's Refrigerator: And Other Stories from the Flip Side of History. Kansas City, Missouri: Andrews McMeel Publishing. ISBN 0-7407-1419-8.
