= Danny Elfman discography =

Select commercially released recordings of Danny Elfman's music for film, television, stage and the concert hall. For a full list of Elfman's compositions, see List of compositions by Danny Elfman. For Elfman's recordings as lead singer/songwriter for Oingo Boingo, see the Oingo Boingo discography page.

== Solo releases ==
Release date	Album	Type	Label	Notes
1984	Gratitude	Single	MCA Records	
1984	So-Lo	Album	MCA Records	Often retrospectively attributed to Oingo Boingo.
2006	Serenada Schizophrana	Album	Sony Classical	First classical work. Commissioned by the American Composers Orchestra, which premiered the piece in 2005. Album features John Mauceri conducting the Hollywood Studio Symphony Orchestra.
2019	Eleven Eleven	Album	Sony Classical	Featuring violinist Sandy Cameron with John Mauceri conducting the Royal Scottish National Orchestra, and the Berlin Philharmonic Piano Quartet
2020	Happy	Single	Anti-Records & Epitaph Records	
2021	Sorry	Single		
2021	Love in the Time of COVID	Single		
2021	Kick Me	Single		
2021	True	Single		
2021	Insects	Single		
2021	Big Mess	Album	Anti-Records & Epitaph Records	
2022	Bigger. Messier.	Remixes		
2027	TBA	Album	TBA	

== Original scores ==
=== 1980s and 1990s ===
Release date	Album	Type	Label	Notes
1983	Forbidden Zone	Soundtrack	Varèse Sarabande	
1986	Pee-wee's Big Adventure/Back to School	Re-recording	Varèse Sarabande	Album features re-recordings of Elfman's scores for 1985's Pee-wee's Big Adventure and 1986's Back to School; The original recording of Pee-wee's Big Adventure was unavailable until the 2011 release of the Danny Elfman & Tim Burton 25th Anniversary Music Box; Elfman appears in Back to School as lead singer of Oingo Boingo performing the song "Dead Man's Party", which appears on the MCA song soundtrack
1986	Wisdom	Soundtrack	Varèse Sarabande	
1987	Summer School	Soundtrack	Chrysalis Records	Though this remains Elfman's only completely unreleased film score to date, he wrote and performed the pop tune "Happy", which appears on film's song soundtrack
1988	Beetlejuice	Soundtrack	Geffen Records	
1988	Midnight Run	Soundtrack	MCA	
1988	Big Top Pee-wee	Soundtrack	Arista	The original soundtrack release including dialogue was reissued by PEG; An expanded album without dialogue was released by La-La Land Records in 2014
1988	Scrooged	Score		
1989	Batman	Score	Warner Bros. Records	Won Elfman's only Grammy for Best Score Soundtrack Album for a Motion Picture, Television or Other Visual Media; Re-released with complete remastered score by La-La Land Records in 2010
1990	Nightbreed	Soundtrack	MCA	
1990	Dick Tracy	Score	Sire Records	Nominated for 33rd Grammy Award for Best Instrumental Composition Written for a Motion Picture or for Television; Complete score was remastered and released by Intrada Records in 2016
1990	Darkman	Soundtrack	MCA	In 2020, La-La Land Records issued a 2-CD album with the 1990 soundtrack album on CD 1, and an expanded score presentation on CD 2.
1990	Music for a Darkened Theatre, Vol. 1	Compilation	MCA	
1990	Edward Scissorhands	Soundtrack	MCA	Nominated for 34th Grammy Award for Best Instrumental Composition Written for a Motion Picture or for Television; Complete expanded and remastered score released by Intrada Records in 2015
1992	Article 99	Soundtrack	Varèse Sarabande	
1992	Batman Returns	Soundtrack	Warner Bros. Records	Expanded, remastered score released from La-La Land Records in 2010
1993	Sommersby	Soundtrack	Elektra	
1993	The Nightmare Before Christmas	Soundtrack	Walt Disney Records	Re-released in 2006 with an additional disc featuring covers by Marilyn Manson, Fiona Apple, Fall Out Boy and Panic! at the Disco, as well as several of Elfman's original song demos Elfman's first score for an animated film.
1994	Black Beauty	Soundtrack	Giant	Expanded edition released by La-La Land Records in 2013
1995	Dolores Claiborne	Soundtrack	Varèse Sarabande	Expanded edition from the label in 2020.
1995	Dead Presidents	Soundtrack	Capitol Records	With one Elfman track: "Dead President's Theme"; Score remains unreleased except for a suite included on Music for a Darkened Theatre, Vol. 2
1995	To Die For	Soundtrack	Varèse Sarabande	
1996	Mission: Impossible	Soundtrack	Phillips	With three Elfman tracks: "Impossible Mission", "Claire" and "Trouble"
1996	Mission: Impossible	Score	Point Music	Expanded and remastered score released by La-La Land Records in 2019
1996	Music for a Darkened Theatre, Vol. 2	Compilation	MCA	
1996	The Frighteners	Soundtrack	MCA	
1996	Extreme Measures	Soundtrack	Varèse Sarabande	
1996	Mars Attacks!	Soundtrack	Atlantic	First Elfman score to receive an expanded edition, released in 2009 by La-La Land Records
1997	Men in Black	Soundtrack	Sony Music	With two Elfman tracks: "M.I.B. Main Theme" and "M.I.B. Closing Theme"
1997	Men in Black	Score	Columbia Records	Nominated for 70th Academy Award for Best Original Musical or Comedy Score, and for 40th Grammy Award for Best Instrumental Composition Written for a Motion Picture or for Television
1997	Flubber	Soundtrack	Walt Disney Records	
1997	Good Will Hunting	Soundtrack with two Elfman tracks	Capitol Records	
1997	Good Will Hunting	Score	Music Box Records	Nominated for 70th Academy Award for Best Original Dramatic Score
1998	A Simple Plan	Soundtrack	Compass III	
1998	A Civil Action	Soundtrack	Hollywood Records	
1999	Instinct	Soundtrack	Varèse Sarabande	
1999	Anywhere but Here	Soundtrack	Atlantic	With one Elfman track: "Anywhere But Here Score Suite"
1999	Sleepy Hollow	Soundtrack	Hollywood Records	In 2021 Intrada Records issued a 3-CD set featuring the full score and the soundtrack album remastered.

=== 2000s ===
Release date	Album	Type	Label	Notes
2000	The Family Man	Soundtrack		
2000	Proof of Life	Soundtrack	Varèse Sarabande	
2001	Planet of the Apes	Soundtrack	Sony Music	Complete score released by La-La Land Records in 2012
2002	Spider-Man	Soundtrack	Columbia Records	With two Elfman tracks: "Main Titles" and "Farewell"
2002	Spider-Man	Score	Sony Music Soundtrax	Nominated for 45th Grammy Award for Best Score Soundtrack Album for a Motion Picture, Television or Other Visual Media
2002	Men in Black II	Soundtrack	Columbia Records	
2002	Red Dragon	Soundtrack	Decca Records	
2002	Chicago	Soundtrack	Sony Legacy	With two Elfman tracks: "After Midnight" and "Roxie’s Suite"
2003	Hulk	Soundtrack	Decca Records	
2003	Big Fish	Soundtrack	Sony Classical	Nominated for 76th Academy Award for Best Original Score; for 61st Golden Globe Award for Best Original Score, and for 47th Grammy Award for Best Score Soundtrack Album for a Motion Picture, Television or Other Visual Media
2004	Spider-Man 2	Soundtrack	Columbia Records	With two Elfman tracks: "Spidey Suite" and "Doc Ock Suite"
2004	Spider-Man 2	Score	Sony Masterworks	
2005	Charlie and the Chocolate Factory	Soundtrack	Abbey Road Studios	Nominated for 48th Grammy Award for Best Song Written for a Motion Picture, Television or Other Visual Media (Wonka's Welcome Song)
2005	Corpse Bride	Soundtrack	Warner Bros. Records	
2006	Nacho Libre	Soundtrack	Lakeshore Records	With one Elfman track: "Ramses Suite"
2006	Charlotte's Web	Soundtrack	Sony Classical	
2007	Meet the Robinsons	Soundtrack	Columbia Records	
2007	The Kingdom	Soundtrack	Varèse Sarabande	
2008	Standard Operating Procedure	Soundtrack	Varèse Sarabande	
2008	Wanted	Soundtrack	Lakeshore Records	
2008	Hellboy II: The Golden Army	Soundtrack	Varèse Sarabande	
2008	Milk	Soundtrack	Decca Records	Nominated for 81st Academy Award for Best Original Score, and for 52nd Grammy Award for Best Score Soundtrack Album for a Motion Picture, Television or Other Visual Media
2009	Notorious	Soundtrack	Universal Music Group	With one Elfman track: "The Notorious Theme"
2009	Terminator Salvation	Soundtrack	Warner Bros. Records	
2009	Taking Woodstock	Soundtrack	Rhino Records	With four Elfman tracks: "Taking Woodstock Titles", Elliot's Place, "Happening (Office #2)" and "Perspective Extended"
2009	Taking Woodstock	Score	La-La Land Records	

=== 2010s ===
Release date	Album	Type	Label	Notes
2010	The Wolfman	Soundtrack	Varèse Sarabande	
2010	Alice in Wonderland	Soundtrack	Walt Disney Records	Nominated for 68th Golden Globe Award for Best Original Score, and for 53rd Grammy Award for Best Score Soundtrack Album for a Motion Picture, Television or Other Visual Media
2010	The Next Three Days	Soundtrack	Lionsgate	
2011	Restless	Soundtrack	La-La Land Records	
2011	Danny Elfman & Tim Burton 25th Anniversary Music Box	Compilation	Warner Records	17-disc box set of expanded and remastered presentations of the scores Elfman wrote for 13 of Tim Burton's films from 1985 to 2010, as well as music from television and special projects. Accompanied by a 263-page illustrated book chronicling the creative partnership between Elfman and Burton, the set included much previously unreleased music, and marked the first time the score to Elfman's first film Pee-wee's Big Adventure was made available.
2011	Real Steel	Soundtrack	Interscope	With one Elfman track: "Kenton"
2011	Real Steel	Score	Varèse Sarabande	
2011	Iris	Soundtrack	Cirque Du Soleil Musique	
2011	Scrooged	Score	La-La-Land Records	The full score for this 1988 film remained unavailable until this La-La Land's 2011 release, though a short suite of music was included on the 1990 compilation Music for a Darkened Theatre, Vol 1
2012	Dark Shadows	Soundtrack	Sony Music	With two Elfman tracks: "Dark Shadows – Prologue" and "The End?"
2012	Dark Shadows	Score	WaterTower Music	
2012	Men in Black 3	Soundtrack	Sony Classical	
2012	Frankenweenie	Soundtrack	Walt Disney Records	
2012	Silver Linings Playbook	Soundtrack	Sony Classical	With two Elfman tracks: "Silver Lining Titles" and "Walking Home"
2012	Silver Linings Playbook	Score	Sony Music	
2012	Hitchcock	Soundtrack	Sony Masterworks	
2012	Promised Land	Soundtrack	Relativity Music Group	
2013	Oz the Great and Powerful	Soundtrack	Walt Disney Records	
2013	Epic	Soundtrack	Columbia Records	
2013	American Hustle	Soundtrack	Madison Gate Records	With one Elfman track: "Irving Montage"
2014	Mr. Peabody & Sherman	Soundtrack	Relativity Music Group	Replaced Alan Silvestri
2014	The Unknown Known	Soundtrack	La La Land Records	
2014	Big Eyes	Soundtrack	Interscope	With six Elfman tracks: "Opening", "Who's the Artist?", "Margaret", "Walter", "Victory" and "End Credits"
2015	The End of the Tour	Soundtrack	Lakeshore Records	
2015	Fifty Shades of Grey	Soundtrack	Republic Records	With two Elfman tracks: "Ana and Christian" and "Did That Hurt?"
2015	Fifty Shades of Grey	Score	Republic Records	Additional music by David Buckley
2015	Avengers: Age of Ultron	Soundtrack	Hollywood Records	With music of co-composer Brian Tyler; Themes by Alan Silvestri
2015	Goosebumps	Soundtrack	Sony Classical	
2016	Alice Through the Looking Glass	Soundtrack	Walt Disney Records	
2016	Rabbit & Rogue	Soundtrack	Sony Classical	Composed for the ballet Rabbit and Rogue choreographed by Twyla Tharp in 2008 for the American Ballet Theatre
2016	The Girl on the Train	Soundtrack	Sony Classical	
2017	Tulip Fever	Soundtrack	Sony Classical	
2017	Fifty Shades Darker	Soundtrack	Republic Records	With two Elfman tracks: "On His Knees" and "Making It Real"
2017	Fifty Shades Darker	Score	Back Lot Music	Additional music by David Buckley
2017	The Circle	Soundtrack	Sony Classical	
2017	Justice League	Soundtrack	WaterTower Music	Replaced Tom Holkenborg
2018	Fifty Shades Freed	Soundtrack	Republic Records	With two tracks by Elfman: "Freed" and "Seeing Red"
2018	Fifty Shades Freed	Score	Back Lot Music	Additional music by David Buckley
2018	Don't Worry, He Won't Get Far on Foot	Soundtrack	Sony Classical	
2018	The Grinch	Soundtrack	Columbia Records	With two Elfman tracks: "A Wonderful Awful Idea" and "Stealing Christmas"
2018	The Grinch	Score	Columbia Records	
2019	Dumbo	Soundtrack	Walt Disney Records	
2019	Men in Black: International	Soundtrack	Columbia Records	Co-composed with Chris Bacon

=== 2020s ===
Release date	Album	Type	Label	Notes
2020	Dolittle	Soundtrack	Back Lot Music	
2021	The Woman in the Window	Soundtrack		Replaced Trent Reznor and Atticus Ross
2022	Doctor Strange in the Multiverse of Madness	Soundtrack	Hollywood Records; Marvel Music	Themes by Michael Giacchino
2024	Beetlejuice Beetlejuice	Soundtrack	WaterTower Music	
2025	Dark Universe	Soundtrack	Universal Destinations & Experiences	Used for the Dark Universe land at Universal Epic Universe
2025	Dracula	Soundtrack	TBA	
2026	Send Help	Soundtrack	Hollywood Records	
2026	Deadman's Wire	Soundtrack		

== Other ==
Albums that include themes or music written by Elfman where he did not compose the full score:

Release date	Album	Type	Label	Tracks composed by Elfman
1984	Bachelor Party	Soundtrack	I.R.S. Records	"Bachelor Party" and "Something Isn't Right" with Oingo Boingo
1985	Weird Science	Soundtrack	MCA Records	"Weird Science" title song with Oingo Boingo
1991	Pure Luck	Soundtrack	Varèse Sarabande	"Main Title" and "We Found Her"
1992	Tales from the Crypt	Soundtrack	Big Screen Records	"Tales from the Crypt (Main Title)"
1992	Army of Darkness	Soundtrack	Varèse Sarabande	"March of the Dead"
1994	Shrunken Heads	Soundtrack	Full Moon Records	"Main Title"
1997	Songs in the Key of Springfield	Compilation	Rhino Records	"The Simpsons Theme"
1998	Psycho	Soundtrack	Geffen Records	"Intro", based on themes by Bernard Herrmann
2001	Heartbreakers	Soundtrack	RCA Victor	"Heart Breakers Suite 1 & 2", with music by John Debney
2001	Spy Kids	Soundtrack	Chapter III Records	"My Parents Are Spies", "Buddy Pack Escape", "Floop's Song (Cruel World)" and "Sneaking Around Machetes"
2001	Novocaine	Soundtrack	TVT Soundtrax	"Main Titles" and "I Wish"
2005	Music from and Inspired by Desperate Housewives	Compilation	Hollywood Records	"Desperate Housewives Theme"
2008	Batman: The Animated Series	Soundtrack	La-La Land Records	"Main Title" and "End Title"
2009	9	Soundtrack	E1 Music	Themes only. Score composed by Deborah Lurie.
2016	Scream 2: The Deluxe Edition	Soundtrack	Varèse Sarabande	Expanded score album for this 1997 film contained the first commercial release of Elfman's "Cassandra Aria" and "Cassandra Reprise"
2017	Before I Wake	Soundtrack	Varèse Sarabande	"Sean", "Christmas" and "Defeated"
2017	When We Rise	Soundtrack	Hollywood Records	"When We Rise Suite", co-composed with Chris Bacon
2026	Don't Be Dumb	Studio album	AWGE; ASAP Worldwide; RCA	"Stole Ya Flow"; unspecified contribution, by ASAP Rocky
