= List of compositions by Danny Elfman =

This is a list of compositions by Danny Elfman for film, television, stage and the concert hall.

For a list of recordings, see Danny Elfman discography, and for Elfman's work as lead singer/songwriter of Oingo Boingo, see Oingo Boingo discography.

== Film scores ==
The following list consists of select films for which Danny Elfman composed the score and/or songs.

=== 1980s ===
Year	Title	Director	Studio(s)	Notes / Accolades
1980	Forbidden Zone	Richard Elfman	The Samuel Goldwyn Company	First film score Film released in 1982 though Elfman has said he wrote the music in 1980; In addition to composing the score and songs with the Mystic Knights of the Oingo Boingo, Elfman arranged and performed Cab Calloway's "Minnie the Moocher" with new lyrics as the character Satan
1985	Pee-wee's Big Adventure	Tim Burton	Warner Bros. Aspen Film Society	Debut score for a major film studio
1986	Back to School	Alan Metter	Orion Pictures; Paper Clip Productions	In addition to composing the score, Elfman appears in the film as the lead singer of Oingo Boingo performing their song "Dead Man's Party"
1986	Wisdom	Emilio Estevez	20th Century Fox (United States); Cannon Films (International); Gladden Entertainment	Composed, arranged and performed by Elfman entirely on synthesizer
1987	Summer School	Carl Reiner	Paramount Pictures	1984 Publishing put out this previously unreleased score by Elfman in 2023 on CD and on vinyl in 4 different color variants.
1988	Beetlejuice	Tim Burton	Warner Bros. The Geffen Company	At the top of the "Main Titles" music as heard in the film, Elfman sings lyrics from "Day-O (The Banana Boat Song)" in the style of Harry Belafonte, the original version of which is used to comic effect later in the film Nominated- Saturn Award for Best Music
1988	Midnight Run	Martin Brest	Universal Pictures; City Light Films	
1988	Big Top Pee-wee	Randal Kleiser	Paramount Pictures	
1988	Hot to Trot	Michael Dinner	Warner Bros.	
1988	Scrooged	Richard Donner	Paramount Pictures; Mirage Productions	
1989	Batman	Tim Burton	Warner Bros.	Grammy Award Best Score Soundtrack for Visual Media; Grammy Award for Best Instrumental Composition (for "Batman theme")

=== 1990s ===
Year	Title	Director	Studio(s)	Notes
1990	Nightbreed	Clive Barker	20th Century Fox; Morgan Creek Productions	
1990	Dick Tracy	Warren Beatty	Touchstone Pictures; Silver Screen Partners IV; Mulholland Productions	Nominated- Grammy Award for Best Instrumental Composition Written for a Motion Picture or Television
1990	Darkman	Sam Raimi	Universal Pictures; Renaissance Pictures	
1990	Edward Scissorhands	Tim Burton	20th Century Fox	Nominated- Grammy Award for Best Instrumental Composition Written for a Motion Picture or Television; Nominated- Saturn Award for Best Music
1992	Article 99	Howard Deutch	Orion Pictures	
1992	Batman Returns	Tim Burton	Warner Bros.	In addition to composing the score, co-wrote the song "Face to Face" with Siouxsie And The Banshees
1993	Sommersby	Jon Amiel	Warner Bros. Le Studio Canal+ Regency Enterprises; Alcor Films	The opening theme would later become the music for the Regency Enterprises logo, albeit as a condensed sample.
1993	The Nightmare Before Christmas	Henry Selick	Touchstone Pictures; Skellington Productions	First score for an animated Film. In addition to the score, Elfman wrote ten original songs and provided the singing voice of main character Jack Skellington, among others Saturn Award for Best Music; Nominated- Grammy Award for Best Children's Album
1994	Black Beauty	Caroline Thompson	Warner Bros. Warner Bros. Family Entertainment	
1995	Dolores Claiborne	Taylor Hackford	Columbia Pictures; Castle Rock Entertainment	Nominated- Saturn Award for Best Music
1995	Dead Presidents	Albert Hughes; Allen Hughes	Hollywood Pictures; Caravan Pictures; Underworld Entertainment	First Elfman score to be credited as conductor
1995	To Die For	Gus Van Sant	Columbia Pictures; Rank Organisation; Laura Ziskin Productions	Elfman and Van Sant performed some vocals on the score credited to "Little Gus And The Suzettes"
1996	Mission: Impossible	Brian De Palma	Paramount Pictures; Cruise/Wagner Productions	Mission: Impossible themes by Lalo Schifrin
1996	The Frighteners	Peter Jackson	Universal Pictures; WingNut Films	Nominated- Saturn Award for Best Music
1996	Freeway	Matthew Bright	Republic Pictures; The Kushner-Locke Company; Illusion Entertainment Group	
1996	Extreme Measures	Michael Apted	Columbia Pictures; Castle Rock Entertainment; Simian Films	
1996	Mars Attacks!	Tim Burton	Warner Bros. Pictures; Tim Burton Productions	Saturn Award for Best Music; Nominated- Satellite Award for Best Original Score
1997	Men in Black	Barry Sonnenfeld	Columbia Pictures; Amblin Entertainment; Parkes/MacDonald Productions	Saturn Award for Best Music; Nominated- Academy Award for Best Original Musical or Comedy Score; Nominated- Grammy Award for Best Instrumental Composition Written for a Motion Picture or Television
1997	Flubber	Les Mayfield	Walt Disney Pictures; Great Oaks	
1997	Good Will Hunting	Gus Van Sant	Miramax Films; Be Gentlemen	Nominated- Academy Award for Best Original Dramatic Score
1998	A Simple Plan	Sam Raimi	Paramount Pictures (North America and United Kingdom); Concorde Filmverleih (Germany); UGC Fox Distribution (France); Toho-Towa (Japan); Mutual Film Company; Savoy Pictures; Tele-München; Marubeni; Newmarket Capital Group	
1998	A Civil Action	Steven Zaillian	Touchstone Pictures; Paramount Pictures; Wildwood Enterprises, Inc	
1999	Instinct	Jon Turteltaub	Touchstone Pictures; Spyglass Entertainment	
1999	Anywhere but Here	Wayne Wang	20th Century Fox	
1999	Sleepy Hollow	Tim Burton	Paramount Pictures (Select territories); Summit Entertainment (International); Mandalay Pictures; Scott Rudin Productions; American Zoetrope; Tim Burton Productions	Satellite Award for Best Original Score; Saturn Award for Best Music

=== 2000s ===
Year	Title	Director	Studio(s)	Notes
2000	Proof of Life	Taylor Hackford	Warner Bros. Pictures; Castle Rock Entertainment; Bel-Air Entertainment; Anvil Films	Nominated- Satellite Award for Best Original Score
2000	The Family Man	Brett Ratner	Universal Pictures; Beacon Pictures; Saturn Films	
2001	Planet of the Apes	Tim Burton	20th Century Fox; The Zanuck Company	Nominated- Grammy Award Best Score Soundtrack for Visual Media
2001	Spy Kids	Robert Rodriguez	Dimension Films; Troublemaker Studios	Composed with John Debney & Harry Gregson-Williams
2002	Spider-Man	Sam Raimi	Columbia Pictures; Marvel Enterprises; Laura Ziskin Productions	Saturn Award for Best Music; Nominated- Grammy Award Best Score Soundtrack for Visual Media
2002	Men in Black II	Barry Sonnenfeld	Columbia Pictures; Amblin Entertainment; MacDonald Parkes Productions	
2002	Red Dragon	Brett Ratner	Universal Pictures; Imagine Corporation	
2002	Chicago	Rob Marshall	Miramax Films; Producer Circle Co. Zadan/Meron Production	Songs by John Kander & Fred Ebb; Adapted material by Kander Nominated- BAFTA Award for Best Film Music
2003	Hulk	Ang Lee	Universal Pictures; Marvel Studios; Valhalla Motion Pictures; Good Machine	Replaced Mychael Danna Nominated- Saturn Award for Best Music
2003	Big Fish	Tim Burton	Columbia Pictures; Jinks/Cohen Company; The Zanuck Company	Nominated- Academy Award for Best Original Score Nominated- Critics' Choice Movie Award for Best Score; Nominated- Golden Globe Award for Best Original Score; Nominated- Grammy Award Best Score Soundtrack for Visual Media
2004	Spider-Man 2	Sam Raimi	Columbia Pictures; Marvel Enterprises; Laura Ziskin Productions	Nominated- Satellite Award for Best Original Score; Nominated- Saturn Award for Best Music
2005	Charlie and the Chocolate Factory	Tim Burton	Warner Bros. Pictures; Village Roadshow Pictures; The Zanuck Company; Plan B Entertainment; Theobald Film Productions	In addition to score, wrote five songs and sings all vocal parts of the Oompa-Loompa characters Nominated- Grammy Award for Best Song Written for Visual Media (for "Wonka's Welcome Song"); Nominated- Saturn Award for Best Music
2005	Corpse Bride	Tim Burton	Warner Bros. Pictures; Tim Burton Productions; Laika; Patalex II Productions	In addition to the score, composed all four songs and voiced of the character "Bonejangles" who sings "Remains of the Day" Nominated- Satellite Award for Best Original Score
2006	Deep Sea 3D	Howard Hall	Warner Bros. Films; IMAX Business Needs	Adapted from Elfman's concert work Serenada Schizophrana, with additional music by Elfman and composer Deborah Lurie
2006	Nacho Libre	Jared Hess	Paramount Pictures; Nickelodeon Movies; Black & White	
2006	Charlotte's Web	Gary Winick	Paramount Pictures; Nickelodeon Movies; Walden Media; The K Entertainment Company	
2007	Meet the Robinsons	Stephen Anderson	Walt Disney Pictures; Walt Disney Animation Studios	Nominated- Annie Award for Music in a Feature Production
2007	Spider-Man 3	Sam Raimi	Columbia Pictures; Marvel Enterprises; Laura Ziskin Productions	Themes only Score composed by Christopher Young
2007	The Kingdom	Peter Berg	Universal Pictures; Relativity Media; Forward Pass; Stuber/Parent	
2008	Standard Operating Procedure	Errol Morris	Sony Pictures Classics; Participant Media	Elfman's score incorporates two movements from his Serenada Schizophrana concert work, specifically "Pianos" and "Blue Strings" reworked and retitled as "Main Titles: Vacation in Iraq" and "A Bad Feeling" respectively
2008	Wanted	Timur Bekmambetov	Universal Pictures; Spyglass Entertainment; Relativity Media; Marc Platt Productions; Kickstart Productions; Top Cow Productions	In addition to the score, wrote and sang the song "The Little Things" in English and Russian for the soundtrack
2008	Hellboy II: The Golden Army	Guillermo del Toro	Universal Pictures; Relativity Media; Lawrence Gordon/Lloyd Levin Productions; Dark Horse Entertainment	Hellboy themes by Marco Beltrami
2008	Milk	Gus Van Sant	Focus Features; Axon Films; Groundswell Productions; Jinks/Cohen Company	Nominated- Academy Award for Best Original Score; Nominated- Critics' Choice Movie Award for Best Score; Nominated- Grammy Award Best Score Soundtrack for Visual Media; Nominated- Satellite Award for Best Original Score
2009	Notorious	George Tillman, Jr.	Fox Searchlight Pictures; Bad Boy Films; By Storm Films; State Street Pictures; Voletta Wallace Films	
2009	Terminator Salvation	McG	Warner Bros. Pictures (United States); Columbia Pictures (International); The Halcyon Company; Wonderland Sound and Vision	Terminator themes by Brad Fiedel
2009	9	Shane Acker	Focus Features; Relativity Media; Lux Animation	Elfman provided themes only, with score composed by Deborah Lurie
2009	Taking Woodstock	Ang Lee	Focus Features	

=== 2010s ===
Year	Title	Director	Studio(s)	Notes
2010	The Wolfman	Joe Johnston	Universal Pictures; Relativity Media; Stuber Pictures	Elfman's original score was initially rejected by the studio and replaced with a new score by Paul Haslinger. The studio ultimately reverted to Elfman's music, though some cues had to be reworked to fit the film's final edit.
2010	Alice in Wonderland	Tim Burton	Walt Disney Pictures; Roth Films; The Zanuck Company; Team Todd	Nominated- BAFTA Award for Best Film Music; Nominated- Golden Globe Award for Best Original Score; Nominated- Grammy Award for Best Score Soundtrack for Visual Media
2010	The Next Three Days	Paul Haggis	Lionsgate; Highway 61 Films; Fidélité Films	
2011	Restless	Gus Van Sant	Sony Pictures Classics (United States); Columbia Pictures (International); Imagine Entertainment	
2011	Real Steel	Shawn Levy	Touchstone Pictures; DreamWorks Pictures; 21 Laps Entertainment; ImageMovers; Montford Murphy Productions	
2012	Dark Shadows	Tim Burton	Warner Bros. Pictures; Village Roadshow Pictures; Infinitum Nihil; GK Films; The Zanuck Company	
2012	Men in Black 3	Barry Sonnenfeld	Columbia Pictures; Amblin Entertainment; Hemisphere Media Capital; P+M Image Nation; Imagination Abu Dhabi	
2012	Frankenweenie	Tim Burton	Walt Disney Pictures; Tim Burton Productions	Saturn Award for Best Music
2012	Silver Linings Playbook	David O. Russell	The Weinstein Company	
2012	Hitchcock	Sacha Gervasi	Fox Searchlight Pictures; The Montecito Picture Company; Cold Spring Pictures	
2012	Promised Land	Gus Van Sant	Focus Features; Participant Media; Image Nation Abu Dhabi; Pearl Street Films; Sunday Night Productions	
2013	Oz the Great and Powerful	Sam Raimi	Walt Disney Pictures; Roth Films	Nominated- Saturn Award for Best Music
2013	Epic	Chris Wedge	20th Century Fox; 20th Century Fox Animation; Blue Sky Studios	Nominated- Annie Award for Music in a Feature Production
2013	American Hustle	David O. Russell	Columbia Pictures; Atlas Entertainment; Annapurna Pictures	
2014	Mr. Peabody & Sherman	Rob Minkoff	20th Century Fox; DreamWorks Animation; PDI/DreamWorks; Bullwinkle Studios	Nominated- Annie Award for Music in a Feature Production
2014	The Unknown Known	Errol Morris	Radius-TWC; History Films; Moxie Pictures; Participant Media	
2014	Big Eyes	Tim Burton	The Weinstein Company; Electric City Entertainment; Silverwood Films; Tim Burton Productions	
2015	The End of the Tour	James Ponsoldt	A24; Anonymous Content; Kilburn Media; Modern Man Films	
2015	Fifty Shades of Grey	Sam Taylor-Johnson	Universal Pictures; Focus Features; Michael De Luca Productions; Trigger Street Productions	Except the cue "Bliss" written by David Buckley
2015	Avengers: Age of Ultron	Joss Whedon	Marvel Studios	Themes by Alan Silvestri & Patrick Doyle; Composed with Brian Tyler
2015	Goosebumps	Rob Letterman	Columbia Pictures; Sony Pictures Animation; LStar Capital; Village Roadshow Pictures; Original Film; Scholastic Entertainment	
2016	Alice Through the Looking Glass	James Bobin	Walt Disney Pictures; Roth Films; Team Todd; Tim Burton Productions	
2016	Before I Wake	Mike Flanagan	Netflix; Intrepid Pictures; Demarest Films; MICA Entertainment	Composed with The Newton Brothers
2016	The Girl on the Train	Tate Taylor	Universal Pictures (Worldwide); Mister Smith Entertainment (EMEA); DreamWorks Pictures; Reliance Entertainment; Marc Platt Productions	
2017	Tulip Fever	Justin Chadwick	The Weinstein Company (United States); Entertainment Film Distributors (United Kingdom); Worldview Entertainment; Paramount Pictures (Note: Paramount, which initially acquired rights to the film, were only given a studio credit in the final film.); Ruby Films	
2017	Fifty Shades Darker	James Foley	Universal Pictures; Perfect World Pictures (Note: Even though Perfect World Pictures produced the film, their logo is not shown on any promotional material or in the film itself.); Michael De Luca Productions; Trigger Street Productions	
2017	The Circle	James Ponsoldt	STXfilms; EuropaCorp; Image Nation Abu Dhabi; Playtone; Likely Story; IM Global; Parkes + Macdonald Productions; Route One; 1978 Films	
2017	Justice League	Zack Snyder (Note: Snyder was the director during principal photography, but was replaced by Joss Whedon during post-production. Snyder retained directorial credit for the finished film, though reports have indicated Whedon reshot a majority of the film.)	Warner Bros. Pictures; RatPac-Dune Entertainment (Note: In home release, RatPac-Dune Entertainment was replaced with Access Entertainment (RatPac's current owner), following the rape and sexual harassment allegations against RatPac-Dune's CEO, Brett Ratner.); DC Films; Atlas Entertainment; Cruel and Unusual Films	Replaced Junkie XL; In addition to creating several new themes for his score, Elfman used the "Batman Theme" from his Batman score, John Williams' "Superman Theme" from Superman, and the Wonder Woman theme from the cue "Is She With You" composed by Hans Zimmer, Robert Badami, Melissa Muik, Mark Andrew Wherry and Steve Mazzaro for Batman v Superman: Dawn of Justice
2018	Fifty Shades Freed	James Foley	Universal Pictures; Perfect World Pictures; Michael De Luca Productions; Trigger Street Productions	
2018	Don't Worry, He Won't Get Far on Foot	Gus Van Sant	Amazon Studios; Iconoclast; Anonymous Content	
2018	The Grinch	Scott Mosier; Yarrow Cheney	Universal Pictures; Illumination	In addition to composing original themes for the film, Elfman incorporated the tune "Welcome Christmas" written for the 1966 How the Grinch Stole Christmas! animated television special, as well as collaborated with Tyler the Creator on a cover of “You’re a Mean One, Mr. Grinch” Nominated- Annie Award for Music in a Feature Production
2019	Aliens, Clowns & Geeks	Richard Elfman	Elfmaniac Media; Producers: Scott Roughgarden, Bernie Stern, Debbie Vandermeulen	Composed with Ego Plum
2019	Dumbo	Tim Burton	Walt Disney Pictures; Tim Burton Productions; Infinite Detective Productions; Secret Machine Entertainment	In addition to composing original themes for the film, Elfman incorporated music from Disney's original 1941 animated film, including “Casey Junior," “Pink Elephants on Parade,” and “When I See an Elephant Fly” Nominated- Saturn Award for Best Music
2019	Men in Black: International	F. Gary Gray	Columbia Pictures; Amblin Entertainment; P + M Productions; Image Nation; Tencent Pictures	Composed with Chris Bacon

=== 2020s ===
Year	Title	Director	Studio(s)	Notes
2020	Dolittle	Stephen Gaghan	Universal Pictures; R/K Films; Team Downey Productions; Perfect World Pictures	
2021	The Woman in the Window	Joe Wright	Netflix; 20th Century Studios; Fox 2000 Pictures; Scott Rudin Productions	Replaced Trent Reznor and Atticus Ross.
2022	Doctor Strange in the Multiverse of Madness	Sam Raimi	Marvel Studios	In addition to contributing the full score with several original themes, Elfman referenced thematic material from 2016's Doctor Strange by Michael Giacchino, Captain America: The First Avenger by Alan Silvestri, WandaVision by Robert Lopez and Kristen Anderson-Lopez, and X-Men: The Animated Series; the score also adapts music from Beethoven's Fifth Symphony and Bach's Toccata and Fugue for a climatic fight scene
2022	White Noise	Noah Baumbach	Netflix	
2024	Beetlejuice Beetlejuice	Tim Burton	Warner Bros. Pictures	
2025	Dracula	Luc Besson	LBP Productions; EuropaCorp	
2026	Send Help	Sam Raimi	20th Century Studios; Raimi Productions	
2026	Dead Man's Wire	Gus Van Sant	Row K Entertainment	

== Additional film work ==
In addition to his feature scores, Elfman has supplied thematic material and additional music for films scored by others (theme only unless otherwise noted):

Year	Title	Director	Composer	Notes
1984	Bachelor Party	Neal Israel	Robert Folk	"Bachelor Party Theme" with Oingo Boingo
1985	Weird Science	John Hughes	Ira Newborn	"Weird Science" title song with Oingo Boingo
1991	Pure Luck	Nadia Tass	Jonathan Sheffer	"Main Title" and "We Found Her"
1992	Army of Darkness	Sam Raimi	Joseph LoDuca	"March of the Dead"
1994	Shrunken Heads	Richard Elfman	Richard Band	
1997	Scream 2	Wes Craven	Marco Beltrami	"Cassandra Aria" & "Cassandra Aria Reprise"
1998	Modern Vampires	Richard Elfman	Michael Wandmacher	
1999	My Favorite Martian	Donald Petrie	John Debney	"Uncle Martin's Theme"
2001	Heartbreakers	David Mirkin	John Debney	
2001	Novocaine	David Atkins	Steve Bartek	
2010	Kick-Ass	Matthew Vaughn	John Murphy; Henry Jackman; Marius de Vries; Ilan Eshkeri	"Walk to Rasul's"
2011	Do Not Disturb	Mali Elfman	Mike Einziger; Oliver Hecks	

Elfman composed the music for the Hollywood Pictures logo in 1991, and an excerpt from his main title for Sommersby was subsequently used as the logo music for Regency (the company that made Sommersby) beginning in 1994.

== Concert and stage works ==
The following list consists of select works composed for the stage and concert hall.

Year	Title	Other artists	Notes / Accolades
2005	Serenada Schizophrana	Commissioned and premiered by the American Composers Orchestra, conducted by Stephen Sloane	First commissioned concert work Premiered February 23, 2005 at Carnegie Hall; Recorded in 2006 by conductor John Mauceri and the Hollywood Studio Symphony Orchestra
2008	Rabbit & Rogue		First ballet score, written for Twyla Tharp's Rabbit and Rogue; Co-commission by American Ballet Theatre and Orange County Performing Arts Center; Premiered June 3, 2008, at the Metropolitan Opera House, Lincoln Center; LA Film Festival's Rabbit and Rogue contest provided free usage of Elfman's music to which filmmakers created short films
2011	Iris		Commissioned by Cirque Du Soleil for director Philippe Decouflé's Cirque du Soleil show based on the history and themes of cinema Elfman's score was pre-recorded with an orchestra of 100 musicians (the largest in Cirque du Soleil's history), that was then mixed with the show's eight live, in-house musicians during performance.
2013	Danny Elfman's Music from the Films of Tim Burton	John Mauceri conductor	Nearly two hours of orchestral suites newly arranged by Elfman from his scores for the films of Tim Burton Premiered at the Royal Albert Hall in London on October 7, 2013, with John Mauceri conducting the BBC Concert Orchestra, and Elfman performing the songs of characters Jack Skellington and Oogie Boogie in The Nightmare Before Christmas segment. Continues to tour internationally, with performances in Europe, Japan, Australia, and throughout the U.S. The 2015 performance at Lincoln Center was recorded live and broadcast on PBS
2017	Violin Concerto "Eleven Eleven"	Violinist Sandy Cameron, conductor John Mauceri and the Royal Scottish National Orchestra	First violin concerto Co-commissioned by the Czech National Symphony Orchestra, Stanford Live at Stanford University, and the Royal Scottish National Orchestra for violinist Sandy Cameron; Premiered in Prague June 21, 2017, with Cameron, Mauceri and the Czech National Symphony Orchestra; Recorded in 2019 with Cameron, Mauceri and the Royal Scottish National Orchestra
2018	Piano Quartet	Berlin Philharmonic Piano Quartet (Matthew Hunter, Knut Weber, Luis Esnaola, Markus Groh)	First piano quartet Co-commissioned by the Lied Center for Performing Arts University of Nebraska–Lincoln and the Berlin Philharmonic Piano Quartet; Premiered February 6, 2018, at the Lied Center in Lincoln, Nebraska
2019	Gary: A Sequel to Titus Andronicus		Incidental music for the Broadway production written by Taylor Mac, directed by George C. Wolfe and produced by Scott Rudin
2019	Percussion Quartet	Third Coast Percussion	Commissioned by Third Coast Percussion, who premiered the piece at Philip Glass Center's 2019 Central Coast Days & Nights Festival on October 10, 2019
2022	Danny Elfman: From Boingo to ‘Batman’ to ‘Big Mess’ to Beyond!	Steve Bartek (conductor), Wes Borland (guitar), Stu Brooks (bass), Nili Brosh (guitar), Josh Freese (drums)	Initially announced as Danny Elfman: Past, Present and Future! From Boingo to Batman and Beyond! as part of Coachella 2020, the concert was postponed to April 16, 2022, due to the COVID-19 pandemic Featuring selections of Elfman's film and television music arranged for band, orchestra and choir, as well as songs from his solo album Big Mess and new arrangements of songs from his Oingo Boingo catalogue Expanded for two concerts performed Halloween weekend at the Hollywood Bowl
2022	Cello Concerto	Gautier Capucon (cello), Wiener Symphoniker, David Robertson (conductor)	Commissioned jointly by Wiener Konzerthaus, Wiener Symphoniker, Orchestre Philharmonique de Radio France, San Francisco Symphony Orchestra and Sofia Philharmonic Orchestra. World premiere Wiener Konzerthaus, Vienna 18 March 2022
2022	Percussion Concerto	Colin Currie (percussion), London Philharmonic Orchestra, Ludwig Wicki (conductor)	Commissioned jointly by London Philharmonic Orchestra and Soka University of America; World premiere Royal Festival Hall, London 25 March 2022
2022	Wunderkammer	National Youth Orchestra of Great Britain, Andrew Gourlay (conductor)	Commissioned by National Youth Orchestra of Great Britain; World premiere Bridgewater Hall, Manchester 3 August and then at the BBC Proms, 6 August 2022
2023	Suite for Chamber Orchestra	Orpheus Chamber Orchestra	Co-commissioned by the Library of Congress, The Andre Kostelanetz Royalty Pool, the Los Angeles Chamber Orchestra, and the National Symphony Orchestra of Ireland; World premiere St. Mark's Episcopal Church (Washington, D.C.) 4 May 2023

== Television ==
Elfman has written the theme music and occasional episodic scores for several television series, including:

Year	Title	Notes
1985	Alfred Hitchcock Presents	Episode: "The Jar", directed by Tim Burton
1985	Amazing Stories	Episodes: "Mummy, Daddy" & "The Family Dog" with Steve Bartek
1986	Pee-wee's Playhouse	Episodes: "Monster in the Playhouse," "Cowboy and the Cowntess," "Store," & "Pee-Wee Catches A Cold"
1986	Sledge Hammer!	Theme music only Score composed by Don Davis, Ron Grant, Lance Rubin & Richard Stone
1986	Fast Times	Theme music only, with Oingo Boingo; Score composed by Barry Goldberg, Arthur Barrow & Steve Schiff
1989	Tales from the Crypt	Theme music only Score composed by various others including Jay Ferguson, Nicholas Pike, Alan Silvestri, J. Peter Robinson & Michael Kamen
1989	Beetlejuice: The Animated Series	Theme music only Score composed by Tom Szczesniak
1989	Oh, No! Not THEM!	Theme music only Score composed by Andrea Saparoff; Unaired pilot for unproduced American remake of The Young Ones
1989	The Simpsons	Theme music only Score composed by Richard Gibbs, Patrick Williams, Ray Colcord, Alf Clausen & Bleeding Fingers Music; Nominated- Primetime Emmy Award for Outstanding Main Title Theme Music
1990	The Flash	Theme music only Score composed by Shirley Walker
1992	Batman: The Animated Series	"Main Title" & "End Credit"; Score composed by various others including Shirley Walker
1993	Family Dog	Theme music only Score composed by Steve Bartek
1997	Perversions of Science	Theme music only Score composed by J. Peter Robinson & Ernest Troost
1999	Dilbert	Theme music only, rearrangement of the title song for Forbidden Zone; Score composed by Adam Cohen & Ian Dye
2004	Desperate Housewives	Theme music only Score composed by Steve Bartek, Stewart Copeland & Steve Jablonsky; Primetime Emmy Award for Outstanding Main Title Theme Music
2005	Point Pleasant	Theme music only Score composed by Robert Duncan
2008	Amas de Casa Desesperadas	Theme music only Score composed by Steve Bartek, Stewart Copeland & Steve Jablonsky
2017	When We Rise	Miniseries; Score composed with Chris Bacon
2022	Wednesday	Television series Theme music Score composed with Chris Bacon; Primetime Emmy Award for Outstanding Main Title Theme Music; Nominated- Primetime Emmy Award for Outstanding Music Composition for a Series (Original Dramatic Score) (for "Woe Is The Loneliest Number")
2026	Stuart Fails to Save the Universe	Theme music only
TBA	Rhona Who Lives By The River	Television series Score composer, songwriter, and executive producer

On October 30, 2015, PBS's "Live from Lincoln Center" broadcast Danny Elfman's Music from the Films of Tim Burton, for which Elfman won Outstanding Music Direction at the 68th Primetime Emmy Awards.

In 2019 selections from his score to the film Midnight Run were used in the third season of Netflix's Stranger Things, including "Stairway Chase" in episodes 5 and 6, and "Wild Ride" and "Package Deal" in episode 6.

== Video games ==
Year	Title	Notes
2004	Fable	Opening title theme Score composed by Russell Shaw
2008	Lego Batman: The Videogame	Excerpts from Batman; DS version also uses excerpts from Batman Returns; Score arranged by Morgan Peeters
2008	Fable II	Composed with Russell Shaw
2009	Wanted: Weapons of Fate	Themes from Wanted; Score composed by Ulf Andersson
2012	Lego Batman 2: DC Super Heroes	Excerpts from Batman and Batman Returns; Compliments score composed by Rob Westwood
2013	Puppet Masterpiece Theater: The Circus	iPad app created by children's entertainment group Organa Kids
2014	Lego Batman 3: Beyond Gotham	Excerpts from Batman; Compliments score composed by Rob Westwood

== Miscellaneous ==
- 1987: Music for Sally Cruikshank's Face Like A Frog animated short (suite included on the 1990 Music for a Darkened Theatre, Vol. 1 compilation).
- 1991: Music for Nike's "Barkley Superhero" animated television commercial (included on the 1996 Music for a Darkened Theatre, Vol. 2 compilation).
- 1996: Music for a 1996/97 Nissan television advertising campaign.
- 1998: Music for a 1998/99 Lincoln-Mercury television advertising campaign.
- 1998: Provided part-composed, part-sampled music for Luigi Serafini's solo exhibition il Teatro della Pittura at the Fondazione Mudima di Milano in Milan, Italy.
- 1998: For Gus Van Sant's shot-for-shot Psycho remake, Elfman and Steve Bartek adapted the original score composed by Bernard Herrmann.
- 2000: Music for Tim Burton's "Stainboy" animated internet series commissioned by Shockwave.com (selections released on Warner Bros. Records' The Danny Elfman & Tim Burton 25th Anniversary Music Box in 2010).
- 2002: Music for Honda's "Power of Dreams" advertising campaign, the first cinema commercial to be shot in the IMAX format.
- 2006: Elfman's "Overeager Overture" commemorating conductor John Mauceri's tenure with the Hollywood Bowl Orchestra premiered September 15, 2006, at the Hollywood Bowl, conducted by Mauceri.
- 2005: Elfman's Batman theme for the DC Animated Universe briefly appeared in The Batman episode "Night and the City".
- 2006: Provided music for Erik Sanko's first feature-length marionette performance The Fortune Teller.
- 2009: Incidental music for the Tim Burton exhibition at the Museum of Modern Art in 2009-2010 (selections released on Warner Bros. Records' The Danny Elfman & Tim Burton 25th Anniversary Music Box in 2010).
- 2013: Composed the music and provided the English-language vocals for the Hong Kong Disneyland attraction Mystic Manor.
- 2016: Scored the "Making of an Oscar" animation which opened the 88th Academy Awards.
- 2016: Composed atonal "horror" music for the short Funny or Die video "Trump Stalks Clinton," which used footage from the Second U.S. presidential debate.
- 2018: Elfman's Flash theme briefly appeared in The Flash episode "Elseworlds: Part One", which is part of the Arrowverse.
- 2019: Elfman's Batman theme for the DC Animated Universe briefly appeared in the DC Universe Animated Original Movies feature film Justice League vs. the Fatal Five.
- 2019: Elfman's Batman and Flash themes briefly appeared in the Supergirl episode "Crisis on Infinite Earths: Part One" and in The Flash episode "Crisis on Infinite Earths: Part Three" respectively, both part of the Arrowverse.
- 2020: Re-recorded and released a "nursery rhyme" version of his 1982 Oingo Boingo song "Running on a Treadmill" while under quarantine from the coronavirus pandemic.
- 2020: Scored the 10-minute video "Joe Biden," which introduced Joe Biden's acceptance of the presidential candidacy nomination at the 2020 Democratic National Convention.
- 2021: Released Big Mess, Elfman's first "rock record in 27 years" and first solo record since 1984's So-Lo.
- 2021: Elfman's Batman theme for the DC Animated Universe briefly appeared during the Warner 300 presentation scene in the Looney Tunes film Space Jam: A New Legacy.
- 2021: Elfman's Spider-Man theme briefly appeared in the Marvel Cinematic Universe film Spider-Man: No Way Home.
- 2022: Elfman's Batman theme for the DC Animated Universe briefly appeared in the Harley Quinn episode "Batman Begins Forever".
- 2023: Elfman's Batman theme is used in the DC Extended Universe film The Flash.
- 2024: Elfman's Batman theme briefly appeared in the Amazon Prime Video series Invincible episode "I Thought You Were Stronger".
- 2024: Elfman's Batman theme for the DC Animated Universe briefly appeared in the DC Animated Movie Universe feature film Justice League: Crisis on Infinite Earths - Part Three.
- 2025: Scored the music for the Dark Universe section of Universal Epic Universe.
