= List of Danny Elfman film and television appearances =

In addition to contributing scores to over 100 feature films and themes to television series, Danny Elfman has made a number of appearances in film and on television, typically as himself, in a singing role or as the lead singer of Oingo Boingo. For a full list of Elfman's compositions and discographies, see the List of compositions by Danny Elfman page, his film and concert music discography page and the Oingo Boingo discography page.

Year	Film/show	Role	Director	Studio/distributor	Notes/accolades
1976	The Gong Show	Himself (uncredited)	Chuck Barris (Host/Producer)	NBC	Performed trombone with The Mystic Knights of the Oingo Boingo; the group won the episode, scoring 24 points out of 30
1977	I Never Promised You a Rose Garden	Drummer (uncredited)	Anthony Page	Shout! Factory	Drummer, uncredited
1977	Hot Tomorrows	Singer	Martin Brest	American Film Institute	Appeared with The Mystic Knights of the Oingo Boingo performing the song "St. James Infirmary Blues"
1981	Urgh! A Music War	Himself	Derek Burbidge	Lorimar	As lead singer/songwriter of Oingo Boingo
1981	Longshot (aka Long Shot Kids)	Himself	E.W. Swackhamer	Greentree Productions	As lead singer/songwriter of Oingo Boingo
1982	Forbidden Zone	Satan	Richard Elfman	Fantoma	
1984	Good Morning, Mr. Orwell	Himself	Nam June Paik	WNET TV, NYC / Centre Pompidou, Paris	As lead singer/songwriter for Oingo Boingo
1986	Back to School	Himself	Alan Metter	Orion Pictures	As lead singer/songwriter for Oingo Boingo
1993	The Nightmare Before Christmas	Jack Skellington (singing voice), Barrel, Clown with the Tear Away Face (voices)	Henry Selick	Touchstone Pictures	In addition to writing and producing the score and ten original songs, Elfman provided the singing voice of main character Jack Skellington, among others First score for an animated film
1996	Farewell: Live from the Universal Amphitheatre, Halloween 1995	Himself	Danny Elfman, Steve Bartek, Ellen Engel (producers)	A&M Records	Appears as lead singer of Oingo Boingo in live concert recording of their final shows as a band Released on VHS concurrent with the album and in 2001 on DVD; currently out-of-print Includes ten minutes of footage of Elfman performing with The Mystic Knight of the Oingo Boingo in the 1970s
1997	Flubber	Himself	Les Mayfield	Walt Disney Pictures, Great Oaks	
2000	The Gift	Tommy Lee Ballard	Sam Raimi	Paramount Classics	
2005	Charlie and the Chocolate Factory	Oompa-Loompas (voices, uncredited)	Tim Burton	Warner Bros.	In addition to composing the film's score and songs, Elfman provided the singing voices for all Oompa Loompa characters.
2005	Corpse Bride	Bonejangles (voice)	Tim Burton	Warner Bros.	
2006	The Late Late Show with Craig Ferguson	Himself	Tim Mancinelli, Brian McAloon	CBS Television Studios	Appears as the second guest on December 19, season three, episode 64; Discusses early career, scoring Charlotte's Web and his brother Richard, who gave Ferguson his first film role
2008	Proud Iza	Narrator (voice)	Anna Condo	Fern Films	In addition to providing narration, Elfman's music from Standard Operating Procedure was used for this short film
2010	DemiUrge Emesis	Narrator (voice)	Aurelio Voltaire	Self produced by Voltaire	Part of Voltaire's stop motion short film series "Chimerascope" featuring voice-overs by music icons including Deborah Harry, Richard Butler and Gerard Way
2015	Live from Lincoln Center: Danny Elfman's Music from the Films of Tim Burton	Himself	Andrew Carl Wilk, Jim Fagan	PBS	Performed songs from The Nightmare Before Christmas; Won Outstanding Music Direction at the 68th Primetime Emmy Awards, Elfman's second Emmy Award
2016	Score	Himself	Matt Schrader	Gravitas Ventures	Appeared among over 50 film composers discussing the craft of writing music for movies and influential figures in the business
2019	The Imagineering Story	Himself	Leslie Iwerks	Disney+	Appears in episode 5, "A Carousel of Progress", to discuss his compositions for Hong Kong Disneyland's Mystic Manor
2020	Prop Culture	Himself	Jason C. Henry	Disney+	Episode: "Tim Burton's The Nightmare Before Christmas"
