= International Film Music Critics Association Award for Best New Archival Release of an Existing Score – Re-Release or Re-Recording =

International fim music award

The International Film Music Critics Association Award for Best New Archival Release of an Existing Score – Re-Release or Re-Recording is an annual award given by the International Film Music Critics Association, or the IFMCA. The award is given to the composer(s) of a score's re-release and/or re-recording deemed to be the best in a given year. Recipients of the award also include conductors, album producers, album artwork artists and liner note writers. The award was first given in 1998, and separated into two categories; one for re-releases, and another for re-recordings (it was awarded separately again in 2009, 2012 and 2013). It has been awarded every year since 2008.

== Winners and nominations ==
=== 1990s ===
Year	Score	Recipient(s)	Label
1998	Best New Recording of a Previously Existing Score		
1998	Superman	John Williams (music), John Debney (conductor), Royal Scottish National Orchestra (performers)	
1998	The Agony and the Ecstasy	Alex North (music), Jerry Goldsmith (conductor), Royal Scottish National Orchestra (performers)	
1998	Body Heat	John Barry (music), Joel McNeely (conductor), London Symphony Orchestra (performers)	
1998	The 7th Voyage of Sinbad	Bernard Herrmann (music), John Debney (conductor), Royal Scottish National Orchestra (performers)	
1998	Viva Zapata!	Alex North (music), Jerry Goldsmith (conductor), Royal Scottish National Orchestra (performers)	
1998	Best Re-Release of a Previously Existing Score		
1998	Close Encounters of the Third Kind	John Williams	Arista
1998	The Greatest Story Ever Told	Alfred Newman	Rykodisc
1998	Krull	James Horner	Super Collector
1998	The Living Daylights	John Barry	Rykodisc
1998	The Magnificent Seven	Elmer Bernstein	Rykodisc

=== 2000s ===
Year	Score	Recipient(s)	Label
2007	Best New Release/Re-Release/Re-Recording of an Existing Score		
2007	Alien	Jerry Goldsmith (composer); Douglass Fake, Michael Matessino, Nick Redman (producers)	Intrada
2007	Godzilla	David Arnold (composer, producer), Ford A. Thaxton (producer)	La-La Land
2007	The Lord of the Rings: The Return of the King	Howard Shore (composer, producer); Paul Broucek, Peter Jackson, Fran Walsh (producers)	Reprise
2007	The Private Life of Sherlock Holmes	Miklós Rózsa (composer), James Fitzpatrick (producer)	Tadlow
2007	The Wind and the Lion	Jerry Goldsmith (composer); Douglass Fake, Lukas Kendall (producers)	Intrada
2008	Best New Release/Re-Release of an Existing Score		
2008	The Boys from Brazil	Jerry Goldsmith (composer), Douglass Fake (producer)	Intrada
2008	Baby: Secret of the Lost Legend	Jerry Goldsmith (composer), Douglass Fake (producer)	Intrada
2008	Body Double	Pino Donaggio (composer), Douglass Fake (producer)	Intrada
2008	Heavy Metal	Elmer Bernstein (composer), Lukas Kendall (producer)	Film Score Monthly
2008	The Matrix: The Deluxe Edition	Don Davis (composer, producer), Robert Townson (producer)	Varèse Sarabande
2008	Best Re-Recording of an Existing Score		
2008	El Cid	Miklós Rózsa (composer), Nic Raine (conductor), Douglass Fake (producer)	Tadlow
2008	Alone	Dmitri Shostakovich (composer); Mark Fitzgerald (conductor); Anna Bonn, John Morgan (producers)	Tribute Film Classics
2008	The Kentuckian/Williamsburg: the Story of a Patriot	Bernard Herrmann (composer); William Stromberg (conductor, producer); Hans-Bernhard Bätzing (producer)	Naxos
2008	She	Max Steiner (composer); William Stromberg (conductor, producer); Anna Bonn, John Morgan (producers)	Tribute Film Classics
2008	An Unfinished Life: The Piano Sketches	Christopher Young (composer, producer), Dave Guili (performer), Flavio Motalla (producer)	BSX
2009	Back to the Future	Alan Silvestri (composer), Douglass Fake (producer)	Intrada
2009	Innerspace	Jerry Goldsmith (composer); M.V. Gerhard, Mike Matessino (producers)	La-La Land
2009	The Journey of Natty Gann	James Horner (composer, producer); Douglass Fake, Simon Rhodes (producers)	Intrada
2009	Star Trek II: The Wrath of Khan	James Horner (composer), Lukas Kendall (producer)	Film Score Monthly
2009	Twilight Zone: The Movie	Jerry Goldsmith (composer); Bruce Botnick, Lukas Kendall, Mike Matessino (producers)	Film Score Monthly

=== 2010s ===
Year	Score	Recipient(s)	Label
2010	Best Archival Release of an Existing Score		
2010	Spartacus	Alex North (composer); Robert Townson (producer, art director, liner notes); Matthew Joseph Peak, Bill Pitzonka (art directors)	Varèse Sarabande
2010	The Alamo	Dimitri Tiomkin (composer); Nic Raine (conductor); James Fitzpatrick, Luc Van De Ven (producers); Ginko Digi (art director); Frank K. Dewald (liner notes)	Tadlow/Prometheus
2010	Batman Returns	Danny Elfman (composer); Neil S. Bulk, MV Gerhard, Dan Goldwasser, Matt Verboys (producers); David C. Fein (art director); John Takis (liner notes)	La-La Land
2010	Black Sunday	John Williams (composer); Mike Matessino (producer, liner notes); Lukas Kendall (producer); Joe Sikoryak (art director); Scott Bettencourt, Jeff Eldridge, Al Kaplan (liner notes)	Film Score Monthly
2010	Conan the Barbarian	Basil Poledouris (composer), Nic Raine (conductor), James Fitzpatrick (producer), Ginko Digi (art director), Frank K. Dewald (liner notes)	Tadlow/Prometheus
2010	Family Plot	John Williams (composer), Mike Matessino (producer, liner notes), Robert Townson (producer)	Varèse Sarabande
2010	The Goonies	Dave Grusin (composer); Mike Matessino (producer, liner notes); Robert Townson (producer); John Alvin, Drew Struzan (art directors)	Varèse Sarabande
2010	Independence Day	David Arnold (composer); Didier C. Deutsch, Mv Gerhard, Mike Matessino, Nick Redman, Matt Verboys (producers); Mark Banning (art director); Dan Goldwasser (liner notes)	La-La Land
2010	Lawrence of Arabia	Maurice Jarre (composer), Nic Raine (conductor), James Fitzpatrick (producers), Frank K. Dewald (liner notes)	Tadlow
2010	Miklós Rózsa Treasury	Miklós Rózsa (composer); Lukas Kendall (producer, liner notes); Joe Sikoryak (art director); Frank K. Dewald, John Fitzpatrick, Al Kaplan (liner notes)	Film Score Monthly
2011	Best Archival Release of an Existing Score		
2011	The Danny Elfman & Tim Burton 25th Anniversary Music Box	Danny Elfman (composer, producer, liner notes), Tim Burton (producer), Matt Taylor (art director); Jeff Bond (liner notes)	Warner Records
2011	The Black Hole	John Barry (composer); Douglass Fake, Randy Thornton (producers); Steve Sterling (art director); Jeff Bond (liner notes)	Disney/Intrada
2011	Days of Heaven	Ennio Morricone (composer), Lukas Kendall (producer, liner notes), Craig Spaulding (producer), Joe Sikoryak (art director), Jeff Bond (liner notes)	Film Score Monthly
2011	Gremlins	Jerry Goldsmith (composer), Mike Matessino (producer, liner notes), Bruce Botnick (producer), Joe Sikoryak (art director), Jeff Bond (liner notes)	Film Score Monthly
2011	Masada	Jerry Goldsmith, Morton Stevens (composer); Bruce Botnick, Douglass Fake, Roger Feigelson (producers); Joe Sikoryak (art director); Jon Burlingame (liner notes)	Intrada
2011	Best Archival Re-Recording of an Existing Score		
2011	Battle of Neretva/The Naked and the Dead	Bernard Herrmann (composer); William Stromberg (conductor, producer); Anna Bonn, John Morgan (producers); Jim Titus (art director); Jim Doherty, Kevin Scott (liner notes)	Tribute Film Classics
2011	Conan the Destroyer	Basil Poledouris (composer), Nic Raine (conductor), James Fitzgerald (producer), Ginko Digi (art director), Frank K. Dewald (liner notes)	Prometheus
2011	The Fall of the Roman Empire	Dimitri Tiomkin (composer); Nic Raine (conductor); James Fitzgerald (producer, liner notes); Ginko Digi, Damien Doherty (art directors); Frank K. Dewald (liner notes)	Prometheus
2011	The Lord of the Rings Symphony	Howard Shore (composer, producer, liner notes), Ludwig Wicki (conductor, producer), Jonathan Schultz (producer), Alan Frey (art director)	Howe Records
2011	Taras Bulba	Franz Waxman (composer), Nic Raine (conductor), James Fitzgerald (producer), Damien Doherty (art director), Frank K. Dewald (liner notes)	Tadlow
2012	Best Archival Release of an Existing Score		
2012	Star Trek: The Motion Picture	Jerry Goldsmith (composer), Mike Matessino (producer, liner notes); Bruce Botnick, Didier C. Deutsch, David C. Fein, MV Gerhard, Matt Verboys (producers); Jim Titus (art director); Jeff Bond (liner notes)	La-La Land
2012	Ben Hur	Miklós Rózsa (composer); Neil S. Bulk, Lukas Kendall, Mike Matessino (producers); Joe Sikoryak (art director); Jeff Bond, Frank K. Dewald (liner notes)	Film Score Monthly
2012	Conan the Barbarian	Basil Poledouris (composer), Douglass Fake (producer), Joe Sikoryak (art director), Nick Redman (liner notes)	Intrada
2012	Hook	John Williams (composer); Didier C. Deutsch, MV Gerhard, Matt Verboys, Mark G. Wilder (producers); Daniel Schweiger (art director), Jim Titus (liner notes)	La-La Land
2012	Star Trek: The Original Series	Alexander Courage (composer, theme); George Duning, Jerry Fielding, Gerald Fried, Sol Kaplan, Samuel Matlovsky, Joseph Mullendore, Fred Steiner (composers); Jeff Bond (producer, liner notes); Neil S. Bulk, MV Gerhard, Lukas Kendall, Matt Verboys (producers); Joe Sikoryak (art director)	La-La Land
2012	Best Archival Re-Recording of an Existing Score		
2012	Quo Vadis	Miklós Rózsa (composer); Nic Raine (conductor); James Fitzpatrick, Luc Van De Ven (producers); Ginko Digi (art director); Frank K. DeWald (liner notes)	Prometheus/Tadlow
2012	Adventures of Don Juan/Arsenic and Old Lace	Max Steiner (composer); William Stromberg (conductor, producer); Anna Bonn, John Morgan (producers); Jim Titus (art director); Ryan Brennan, James V. d’Arc, Curt Hardaway (liner notes)	Tribute Film Classics
2012	Notre Dame de Paris: The Music of Maurice Jarre	Maurice Jarre (composer), Nic Raine (conductor), James Fitzgerald (producer, liner notes), Damien Doherty (art director), Frank K. Dewald (liner notes)	Tadlow
2012	The Red House	Miklós Rózsa (composer); Allan Wilson (conductor); Douglass Fake, Kevin Kaska (producers); Joe Sikoryak (art director); Frank K. Dewald, Dan Robbins (liner notes)	Intrada
2012	Wings	J.S. Zamecnik (composer); Peter Boyer, Ira Hearshen (conductors); Dan Goldwasser (producer, art director); Jeannie Gayle Pool (producer, liner notes); MV Gerhard, Dominik Hauser, Matt Verboys (producers)	La-La Land
2013	Best Archival Release of an Existing Score – Re-Release or Re-Recording		
2013	The Salamander	Jerry Goldsmith (composer); Nic Raine (conductor); James Fitzpatrick (producer); Paul de Blieck, Johan van den Broeck, Ginko Digi (art directors); Frank K. DeWald (liner notes)	Prometheus/Tadlow
2013	Breakfast at Tiffany’s	Henry Mancini (composer); Douglass Fake, Roger Feigelson (producers); Joe Sikoryak (art director); Jeff Bond(liner notes)	Intrada
2013	QB VII	Jerry Goldsmith (composer); Nic Raine (conductor); James Fitzpatrick (producer, art director); Damien Doherty, Ginko Digi (art directors); Frank K. DeWald (liner notes)	Prometheus/Tadlow
2013	The Wild Bunch	Jerry Fielding (composer), Lukas Kendall (producer, liner notes), Joe Sikoryak (art director)	Film Score Monthly
2013	Wyatt Earp	James Newton Howard (composer), Dan Goldwasser (producer, art director), Tim Grieving (liner notes)	La-La Land
2014	On the Waterfront	Leonard Bernstein (composer), Douglass Fake (producer), Joe Sikoryak (art director), Frank K. DeWald (liner notes)	Intrada
2014	The Abyss	Alan Silvestri (composer), Robert Townson (producer, art director), Nick Redman (producer), Bill Pitzonka (art director), Julie Kirgo (liner notes)	Varèse Sarabande
2014	Empire of the Sun	John Williams (composer), Mike Matessino (producer, liner notes), Jim Titus (art director)	La-La Land
2014	Maleficent	John Debney (composer, producer), Kevin Kaska (additional music), Dan Goldwasser (producer, art director), Jeff Bond (liner notes)	La-La Land
2014	The Lion King	Hans Zimmer (composer, liner notes); Elton John, Tim Rice (lyrics); Randy Thornton (producer), Lorelay Bové (art director), Don Hahn (liner notes)	Disney
2015	Obsession	Bernard Herrmann (composer); Cyril Durand-Roger, Laurent Lafarge, George Litto (producers); David Marques (art director); Daniel Schweiger (liner notes)	Music Box
2015	A.I. Artificial Intelligence	John Williams (composer), Mike Matessino (producer), Jim Titus (art director), Jeff Bond (liner notes)	La-La Land
2015	Braveheart	James Horner (composer); Dan Goldwasser, Mike Matessino (producers); Jim Titus (art director); Jeff Bond (liner notes)	La-La Land
2015	Dances with Wolves	John Barry (composer); Didier C. Deutsch, Ford A. Thaxton, Mark G. Wilder (producers); Mark Banning (art director); Randall D. Larson (liner notes)	La-La Land
2015	Jaws	John Williams (composer), Mike Matessino (producer), Joe Sikoryak (art director), Scott Bettencourt (liner notes)	Intrada
2016	Best Re-Release/Re-Recording of an Existing Score		
2016	The Ten Commandments	Elmer Bernstein (composer); Douglass Fake, Roger Feigelson (producers); Joe Sikoryak (art director); Frank K. DeWald (liner notes)	Intrada
2016	The Blue Max	Jerry Goldsmith (composer), Nic Raine (conductor), James Fitzpatrick (producer, art director), Matthew Wright (art director), Frank K. DeWald (liner notes)	Tadlow
2016	Chinatown	Jerry Goldsmith (composer); Douglass Fake, Roger Feigelson (producers); Joe Sikoryak (art director); Jeff Bond (liner notes)	Intrada
2016	Godzilla	Akira Ifukube (composer), Kaoru Wada (conductor, liner notes), Masaru Hayakawa (liner notes)	King
2016	The Thief of Bagdad	Miklós Rózsa (composer); Nic Raine (conductor); James Fitzpatrick (producers); Jim Titus (art director); Frank K. DeWald (liner notes)	Prometheus/Tadlow
2017	Best New Release, Re-Release or Re-Recording of an Existing Score		
2017	Ben Hur	Miklós Rózsa (composer); Nic Raine (conductor); The City of Prague Philharmonic Orchestra & Chorus (performers); James Fitzpatrick (producer, art director); Gareth Bevan, Nic Finch (art directors); Frank K. Dewald (liner notes)	Tadlow
2017	Close Encounters of the Third Kind	John Williams (composer), Mike Matessino (producer, liner notes), Jim Titus (art director)	La-La Land
2017	Damnation Alley	Jerry Goldsmith (composer); Mike Matessino, Nick Redman (producers); Kay Marshall (art director); Julie Kirgo (liner notes)	Intrada
2017	Duel in the Sun	Dimitri Tiomkin (composer), Nic Raine (conductor), The City of Prague Philharmonic Orchestra & Chorus (performers), James Fitzpatrick (producer), Jim Titus (art director), Frank K. Dewald (liner notes)	Tadlow/Prometheus
2017	E.T. the Extra-Terrestrial	John Williams (composer); Mike Matessino (producer, liner notes), Bruce Botnick (producer), Jim Titus (art director)	La-La Land
2018	Best Archival Release – New Release or New Recording of an Existing		
2018	Dracula	John Williams (composer), Mike Matessino (producer, liner notes), Robert Townson (producer), Jim Titus (art director)	Varèse Sarabande
2018	Bram Stoker’s Dracula	Wojciech Kilar (composer), Dan Goldwasser (producer, art director), Tim Greiving (liner notes)	La-La Land
2018	The Bride Wore Black	Bernard Herrmann (composer); Fernando Velázquez (conductor); The Basque National Orchestra (performers); Jose M. Benitez, Edouard Dubois (producers); Nacho B. Govantes (art director); Frank K. Dewald (liner notes)	Quartet
2018	El hombre y la Tierra	Antón García Abril (composer), Miguel A. Órdóñez (producer, liner notes), Jose M. Benitez (producer), Nacho B. Govantes (art director)	Quartet
2018	The Vikings	Mario Nascimbene (composer), Nic Raine (conductor), The City of Prague Philharmonic Orchestra & Chorus (performers), James Fitzpatrick (producer), Jim Titus (art director), Frank K. Dewald (liner notes)	Tadlow/Prometheus
2019	Best New Archival Release – Re-Release or Re-Recording		
2019	Dial M for Murder	Dimitri Tiomkin (composer), William Stromberg (conductor), The Royal Scottish National Orchestra (performers), Douglass Fake (producer, liner notes), Kay Marshall (art director), Roger Feigelson (liner notes)	Intrada
2019	Air Force One	Jerry Goldsmith (composer); Bryon Davis, Cary E. Mansfield (producers); Bill Pitzonka, Mark Shoolery (art directors); Daniel Schweiger (liner notes)	Varèse Sarabande
2019	Apollo 13	James Horner (composer), Mike Matessino (producer), Kay Marshall (art director), John Takis (liner notes)	Intrada
2019	Bride of Frankenstein	Franz Waxman (composer); Mike Matessino (producer); Dan Goldwasser (art director); Frank K. DeWald, John Waxman (liner notes)	La-La Land
2019	Dracula/The Curse of Frankenstein	James Bernard (composer), Nic Raine (conductor), The City of Prague Philharmonic Orchestra & Chorus (performers), James Fitzpatrick (producer), Nic Finch (art director), Frank K. Dewald (liner notes)	Tadlow
