= Longshot =

Longshot or long shot may refer to:

- a contender (such as a racehorse) that appears to have little or no chance of winning
- Long shot in photography and cinema, an image or scene filmed with a long lens

== Characters ==
- Longshot (Marvel Comics), a Marvel Comics superhero
- Caine the Longshot, a character in the anime series Trigun
- Longshot, member of "The Freedom Fighters" led by Jet, a character from the animated television series Avatar: The Last Airbender

== Film ==
- Long Shot (1939 film), an American film directed by Charles Lamont
- Long Shot, a British film of 1978
- Longshot (1981 film), a film starring Leif Garrett
- The Longshot, a 1986 comedy film directed by Paul Bartel
- Longshot (film), a 2000 film starring Hunter Tylo
- The Long Shot, a 2004 Hallmark Channel film, starring Julie Benz
- The Longshots, a 2008 film starring Ice Cube and Keke Palmer
- Long Shot: The Kevin Laue Story, a 2013 documentary film by Franklin Martin
- Long Shot (2017 film), a documentary directed by Jacob LaMendola
- Long Shot (2019 film), a film starring Seth Rogen and Charlize Theron

== Music ==
- The Longshot (band), an American rock band
- Long Shot, a 1969 album, or its 1968 title song, by the Pioneers
- "Long Shot" (Aimee Mann song), 1996
- "Long Shot" (Baillie & the Boys song), 1988
- "Longshot" (Catfish and the Bottlemen song), 2019
- "Long Shot" (Kelly Clarkson song), 2008
- "Longshot", a song by Common Rider, 2001
- "Longshot", a song by John Fogerty from Revival, 2007
- "Longshot", a song by Waking Ashland from I Am for You, 2004
- "Long shot", a song by Mayu Maeshima, opening music for Re:Zero − Starting Life in Another World, 2021

== Other uses ==
- Long Shot, an atomic weapons test, carried out on Amchitka island in 1965
- Long Shot (TV series), a 1959 Canadian current affairs television series
- Long Shot (Niven), a spacecraft from Larry Niven's Ringworld series
- "Long Shot" (The Professionals), an episode of the television series
- "Long Shot", a season 3 episode of The Casagrandes
- Project Longshot, a design for an interstellar spacecraft
- "Long Shot", a short story by Vernor Vinge
- Long Shot, a memoir about former Major League Baseball player Mike Piazza
- Longshot CS-6, a 2006 Nerf blaster released under the N-Strike|N-Strike series
- Longshot CS-12, a 2014 Nerf blaster released under the Z.E.D Squad sub-series of the Zombie Strike series
- a variation of the Hookshot in the Legend of Zelda series
- Longshot, the name of a single-player game mode in Madden NFL 18
