= The Frighteners (soundtrack) =

Soundtrack album by Danny Elfman
- Released: July 16, 1996
- Studios: Sony Pictures Studios, Culver City, California
- Genre: Film score
- Length: 41:14
- Labels: MCA; Universal
- Producer: Danny Elfman

Danny Elfman chronology
Mission: Impossible (1996)	The Frighteners (1996)	Men in Black (1997)

The Frighteners (Music from the Motion Picture) is the soundtrack album to the 1996 film directed by Peter Jackson. The album contains the film's original score, composed by Danny Elfman, along with a cover of Blue Öyster Cult's "(Don't Fear) The Reaper" performed by New Zealand alternative rock band The Mutton Birds, which played in the film's closing credits. The album was released by MCA Records and Universal Records on July 16, 1996.

== Reception ==
Jason Ankeny, writing for AllMusic, complimented it as an "imaginative" score rating three stars of out five. Filmtracks.com rated 1-star to the album, saying "With the composer's previous ideas for the genre thrust together as a horror score package, The Frighteners is correctly identified by many mainstream listeners as lacking much cohesion or singular creativity."

Todd McCarthy of Variety commented that Elfman's score is "busily in your face and ears". Kenneth Turan of Los Angeles Times called the score as "spooky". Edward Guthmann of San Francisco Gate criticised Elfman's score as an "overmixed onslaught". In retrospect, Cody Hamman of JoBlo.com felt that the score was "done to perfection", while Alex Behan of Stuff called the score as "great". Reviewing for the director's cut, Michael Drucker of IGN wrote "the great Danny Elfman music also comes through really well".

== Track listing ==
All music is composed by Danny Elfman, except where noted.

No.	Title	Writer(s)	Artist(s)	Length
1.	"Intro / Titles"			5:43
2.	"The "Lads""			2:00
3.	"Poltergeists"			2:05
4.	"Victim #38"			1:52
5.	"Who's Next?"			1:39
6.	"The Garden"			3:08
7.	"Chilly"			1:29
8.	"Time"			4:41
9.	"Patty's Place"			2:12
10.	"Flashbacks"			1:07
11.	"Patty Attack"			3:04
12.	"Franks' Wife"			0:50
13.	"Doom"			3:08
14.	"Heaven"			1:46
15.	"(Don't Fear) The Reaper"	Donald "Buck Dharma" Roeser	The Mutton Birds	5:46
Total length:				40:30

== Accolades ==
At the 23rd Saturn Awards, The Frighteners' score was nominated for Best Music. The score won Best Soundtrack at the 1997 Fangoria Chainsaw Awards

== Personnel ==
Credits adapted from CD liner notes.

- Music composer and producer – Danny Elfman
- Conductor – Artie Kane
- Contractor – Patti Zimmitti
- Orchestrator – Steve Bartek
- Additional orchestrations – Edgardo Simone, Mark McKenzie
- Programming – Marc Mann
- Recording and mixing – Shawn Murphy
- Mastering – Patricia Sullivan
- Editing – Ellen Segal
- Musical assistance – Livia Corona
- Copyist – Joel Franklin
- Design – Wilson Design Group
- Art direction – Vartan
- Photography – Pierre Vinet
- Executive in charge of music for Universal Pictures – Harry Garfield
