= Music for a Darkened Theatre: Film & Television Music Volume Two =

Compilation album by Danny Elfman
- Released: December 3, 1996
- Genre: Film score
- Label: MCA
- Producer: Danny Elfman, Ellen Segal

Professional ratings
Review scores
Source	Rating
AllMusic	5/5 stars
Filmtracks	5/5 stars

Music for a Darkened Theatre: Film & Television Music Volume Two is a double-disc compilation album of select film scores and music for television written between 1990 and 1996 by American composer Danny Elfman. It is the second compilation of Elfman's early film work after Music for a Darkened Theatre: Film & Television Music Volume One.

In addition to suites of music from his popular scores to Edward Scissorhands, Mission: Impossible and The Nightmare Before Christmas, the album featured never-before or never-since released music from the films Freeway and Dead Presidents, the television series Amazing Stories, Pee-wee's Playhouse, The Flash and Beetlejuice: The Animated TV Series, and a commercial spot for Nike.

Originally released on the now-defunct label MCA Soundtracks, the album was later transferred to Geffen Records, and is currently out of print.

== Track listing ==
Disc 1
No.	Title	Length
1.	"Edward Scissorhands: Main Titles" (Conducted by Shirley Walker • 1990)	2:36
2.	"Edward Scissorhands: Storytime"	2:35
3.	"Edward Scissorhands: Suite"	4:19
4.	"Edward Scissorhands: Suburbia - Barber"	3:05
5.	"Edward Scissorhands: The Grande Finale"	3:26
6.	"Dolores Claiborne: Main Titles" (1995)	2:45
7.	"Dolores Claiborne: Vera's World"	2:36
8.	"Dolores Claiborne: Flashback"	1:33
9.	"Dolores Claiborne: Sad Room"	0:51
10.	"Dolores Claiborne: End Titles"	4:48
11.	"To Die For: Main Titles" (Conducted by Richard Stone • 1995)	4:09
12.	"To Die For: Suzie's Theme"	1:41
13.	"To Die For: Busted"	2:02
14.	"To Die For: Weepy Donuts"	1:49
15.	"To Die For: Finale"	1:19
16.	"Black Beauty: Main Titles" (1994)	2:28
17.	"Black Beauty: Baby Beauty"	3:11
18.	"Black Beauty: Jump For Joy"	0:57
19.	"Black Beauty: Frolic - Sick"	4:03
20.	"Black Beauty: Bye Bye Jerry"	2:28
21.	"Black Beauty: Memories"	1:28
22.	"Black Beauty: End Titles"	4:42
23.	"Batman Returns: Birth of a Penguin" (Conducted by Jonathan Sheffer • 1992)	5:37
24.	"Batman Returns: Trouble Suite"	2:15
25.	"Batman Returns: The Finale"	3:13
26.	"Batman Returns: End Titles"	4:42
Total length:		71:29

Disc 2
No.	Title	Length
1.	"Mission: Impossible: Trouble" (Conducted by Artie Kane • 1996)	3:20
2.	"Mission: Impossible: Looking for Job"	3:54
3.	"Mission: Impossible Betrayal"	2:57
4.	"Sommersby: Main Titles" (Conducted by Jonathan Sheffer • 1993)	4:40
5.	"Sommersby: Return Montage"	4:28
6.	"Sommersby: Finale - End Titles"	7:21
7.	"Dead Presidents: Main Titles" (1995)	4:02
8.	"Dead Presidents: Daughter"	1:25
9.	"Dead Presidents: Montage"	2:18
10.	"Dead Presidents: Nam"	5:50
11.	"Dead Presidents: Nightmare"	1:18
12.	"The Nightmare Before Christmas: Overture" (1993)	1:47
13.	"The Nightmare Before Christmas: Jack and Sally Suite"	5:03
14.	"The Nightmare Before Christmas: Christmas Eve Montage"	2:11
15.	"Freeway: Main Titles" (1996)	2:45
16.	"Freeway: On the Road"	2:59
17.	"Freeway: Back in the Car"	1:21
18.	"Shrunken Heads: Main Theme"	1:55
19.	"Amazing Stories: Family Dog" (1)	0:53
20.	"Amazing Stories: Family Dog" (2)	1:29
21.	"Amazing Stories: Mummy, Daddy"	2:23
22.	"Barkley Superhero: Nike Commercial"	0:31
23.	"The Flash: Theme"	1:33
24.	"Pee Wee's Playhouse" (1)	0:35
25.	"Pee Wee's Playhouse" (2)	1:10
26.	"Pee Wee's Playhouse" (3)	0:24
27.	"Pee Wee's Playhouse" (4)	1:27
28.	"Beetlejuice: The Animated TV Series: Main Theme"	1:02
29.	"This Is Halloween (Demo from The Nightmare Before Christmas)" (Performed by Danny Elfman)	3:19
Total length:		74:11

Total length of both albums is 2:25:40.

== Liner notes ==
Danny Elfman comments on many of the selections in the liner notes that accompany the album, writing that Edward Scissorhands is one of his personal favorite scores, he wrote ten themes for The Nightmare Before Christmas, he performed guitar on To Die For, Dead Presidents was his first percussion-based score, and Freeway was his first "improvised" score.
