= Music for a Darkened Theatre: Film & Television Music Volume One =

Music For A Darkened Theatre (Film & Television Music Volume One)

Compilation album by Danny Elfman
- Released: October 1990
- Genre: Film score
- Length: 73:12
- Label: MCA Records

Professional ratings
Review scores
Source	Rating
AllMusic	5/5 stars
Filmtracks	3/5 stars

Music for a Darkened Theatre: Film & Television Music Volume One is a compilation album of select film scores and television themes written by American composer Danny Elfman from the early 1980s to 1990.

It is the first of two volumes encompassing Elfman's early career and contains suites of music from his popular film work such as Batman, Dick Tracy and Beetlejuice, as well as themes for the television series The Simpsons and Tales from the Crypt, and several works unreleased at the time of the album's release, including music from Scrooged, Hot to Trot and Sally Cruikshank's animated film Face Like a Frog. The music from the latter two have never been released in any other format.

Originally released on the now-defunct label MCA Records, the album is now licensed for streaming through UMG Recordings, Inc.

== Track listing ==
No.	Title	Length
1.	"Pee-wee's Big Adventure" (Overture / Breakfast Machine / Clown Dream / Drive-In • Conductor: John Coleman, National Philharmonic Orchestra • 1985)	7:01
2.	"Batman" (Batman Theme / Up the Cathedral / Descent into Mystery • Conductor: Shirley Walker, Sinfonia of London • 1989)	8:25
3.	"Dick Tracy" (Main Titles • Conductor: Shirley Walker • 1990)	3:03
4.	"Beetlejuice" (Main Titles / End Titles • Conductor: Bill Ross • 1988)	3:43
5.	"Nightbreed" (Main Titles / Meat for the Beast / End Titles • Conductor: Shirley Walker • 1990)	7:03
6.	"Darkman" (Main Titles / Woe the Darkman, Woe • Conductor: Shirley Walker • 1990)	6:55
7.	"Back to School" (Study Montage • Conductor: John Coleman, National Philharmonic Orchestra • 1986)	1:30
8.	"Midnight Run" (Walsh Gets the Duke / Main Titles / Diner Blues • 1988)	4:42
9.	"Wisdom" (Change of Life / Close Call in Albuquerque • Performed by Danny Elfman • 1986)	4:39
10.	"Hot to Trot" (Main Titles / Wandering Don • 1988)	2:22
11.	"Big Top Pee-wee" (Main Titles / Rise 'N Shine / Pee-wee's Love Theme • Conductor: Bill Ross • 1988)	5:24
12.	"The Simpsons" (Theme • Conductor: Steve Bartek • 1989)	1:30
13.	"Alfred Hitchcock Presents: The Jar" (Suite • 1986)	3:20
14.	"Tales from the Crypt" (Theme • Conductor: Steve Bartek • 1989)	1:29
15.	"Face Like a Frog" (Suite • Performed by Danny Elfman • 1987)	2:08
16.	"Forbidden Zone" (Love Theme • 1980 [sic])	1:16
17.	"Scrooged" (Main Titles / Show Time at IBC / Elliot Gives Blood / Waiter Ablaze / Wild Cab Ride / Luncheonette / Asylum / Crematorium • Conductor: Shirley Walker • 1988)	8:42
Total length:		73:19

== Liner notes ==
Danny Elfman comments on each of the 17 tracks in the liner notes that accompany the album.

For the suite from Pee-wee's Big Adventure (track 1), Elfman states that it was his first orchestral film score and writes, "Filmmusic fans will undoubtedly hear my tributes to Nino Rota and Bernard Herrmann, the two composers who were responsible for igniting my interest in filmmusic way back when I was a kid."

He also writes that the "big, old-fashioned romanticism" of his score to Dick Tracy was inspired by the music of George Gershwin, and that he was influenced by French composer Erik Satie for the Forbidden Zone love theme (track 16). Though the latter cult film directed by his brother Richard Elfman was released nationally in 1982, Elfman notes the music was written in 1980, five years before his "first fullblown film score" for Pee-wee's Big Adventure. In fact, Forbidden Zone premiered at the Los Angeles Filmex film festival in 1980, later receiving a limited theatrical distribution as a midnight movie through The Samuel Goldwyn Company in 1982.

== Critical reception ==
In an article spotlighting "best movie soundtracks" including Erich Wolfgang Korngold's The Adventures of Robin Hood and Bernard Herrmann's Vertigo, Entertainment Weekly listed Music for a Darkened Theatre: Film & Television Music Volume One, noting that in Elfman's work "there's no orchestral effect he won't try, and the results are frisky and ingenious. This compilation of his scores covers everything from the riotous (Pee-wee's Big Adventure) to the murkily dazzling (Batman)."

A 1990 profile of Elfman in The New York Times notes, "As a new collection of excerpts from several of his films and TV shows, called Music for a Darkened Theatre, quickly reveals, Mr. Elfman likes to write large, lush pieces for orchestra, with generous doses of brass and strings."

Giving the album three of five stars, film score review website Filmtracks called the compilation "an excellent cross section" of Elfman's talent, noting that in addition to the "serious, orchestral material" of Batman, Nightbreed and Darkman, there is "a significant amount of Elfman's pop-inspired electronic material," citing the "hip and stylish" music from Midnight Run and Wisdom.

Recalling Elfman's "humble theatrical beginnings and no real musical training", UCLA's Daily Bruin called the compilation "a brilliant departure" from his days as singer/songwriter for the new wave band Oingo Boingo, though they rated the second compilation Music for a Darkened Theatre, Vol. 2 a higher achievement as both "amazingly diverse" stylistically and showing "substantial development" in the craft of music writing.

== Credits ==
- Music composed by Danny Elfman
- Digital editing, mastering: David Collins
- Engineers: Armin Steiner, Bill Jackson, Dan Wallin, Dennis S. Sands, Eric Tomlinson, Michael Boshears, Mike Ross, Bobby Fernandez, Shawn Murphy
- Executive producer: Kathy Nelson
- Orchestrations: Steve Bartek
- Additional orchestrations: Shirley Walker, Steven-Scott Smalley, Bill Ross
- Album producers: Bob Badami, Richard Kraft
- Additional album remixes: Dennis S. Sands
