= Mission: Impossible (score) =

Mission: Impossible – Music from the Original Motion Picture Score

Film score by Danny Elfman
- Released: June 18, 1996
- Genre: Soundtrack
- Length: 52:28
- Label: Point Music
- Producer: Danny Elfman

Danny Elfman chronology
| To Die For (1996) | Mission: Impossible – Music from the Original Motion Picture Score (1996) | The Frighteners (1996) |

Mission: Impossible – Music from the Original Motion Picture Score is the original score album by Danny Elfman for the 1996 film Mission: Impossible. The score was originally planned to be composed by Alan Silvestri, but he was replaced during the post-production by Elfman. The score also includes Lalo Schifrin's original "Theme from Mission: Impossible".

Professional ratings
Review scores
| Source | Rating |
|---|---|
| AllMusic | 4/5 stars |
| Filmtracks.com | 2/5 stars |

== Style ==
While the soundtrack was generally praised for its versatility it was received very diversely as an example of the new directions chosen by the composer.

== Track listing ==
All music is composed by Danny Elfman.

Mission: Impossible (Original Motion Picture Score)
| No. | Title | Length |
|---|---|---|
| 1. | "Sleeping Beauty^{[b]}" | 2:28 |
| 2. | "Mission: Impossible Theme" | 1:02 |
| 3. | "Red Handed^{[a]}" | 4:21 |
| 4. | "Big Trouble" | 5:33 |
| 5. | "Love Theme?" | 2:21 |
| 6. | "Mole Hunt" | 3:02 |
| 7. | "The Disc^{[b]}" | 1:54 |
| 8. | "Max Found" | 1:02 |
| 9. | "Looking for "Job"^{[b]}" | 4:38 |
| 10. | "Betrayal" | 2:56 |
| 11. | "The Heist^{[b]}" | 5:46 |
| 12. | "Uh-Oh!" | 1:28 |
| 13. | "Biblical Revelation" | 1:33 |
| 14. | "Phone Home" | 2:25 |
| 15. | "Train Time^{[a]}^{[b]}" | 4:11 |
| 16. | "Ménage à Trois" | 2:55 |
| 17. | "Zoom A" | 1:53 |
| 18. | "Zoom B^{[a]}" | 2:54 |
| Total length: | | 52:28 |

== 2019 La La Land Expanded release track listing ==
1. 1. Sleeping Beauty**(†) (Film Version) 3:03
2. 2. Theme From Mission: Impossible(§) 1:07 Composed by Lalo Schifrin, arr. Danny Elfman
3. 3. Red Handed** (†/§) (Film Version) 6:21
4. 4. Big Trouble** (Film Version) 7:01
5. 5. Lonely March* 0:54
6. 6. Mole Hunt** (Film Version)/Escape* 3:35
7. 7. Looking For “Job”(†) 4:44
8. 8. Max Returns*/Max At Last* 1:30
9. 9. Max Found 1:05
10. 10. The Disc(†) 1:59
11. 11. Disavowed*/Worse Than You Think** (†) 2:48
12. 12. Langley*(§) 1:01
13. 13. The Heist** (†) (Film Version) 5:05
14. 14. Uh-Oh! 1:31
15. 15. Biblical Revelation 1:36
16. 16. Phone Home 2:28
17. 17. Betrayal** (Film Version) 3:01
18. 18. Love Theme? 2:24
19. 19. Train Time** (Film Version)/Is He?* 5:33
20. 20. Ménage à Trois 2:57
21. 21. Zoom A** (Film Version)/Zoom B**(§) (Film Version) 5:21

ADDITIONAL MUSIC

1. 22. Red Handed**(†) (Alternate Ending) 1:46
2. 23. Disavowed* (Alternate)/Worse Than You Think*(†) (Alternate) 2:59
3. 24. Zoom A** (Alternate)/Zoom B**(§) (Alternate) 5:19

TOTAL DISC TIME: 75:15

TOTAL ALBUM TIME: 128:35

- previously unreleased
  - contains previously unreleased material

§ contains “Theme From Mission: Impossible” by Lalo Schifrin † contains “The Plot” by Lalo Schifrin

== Personnel ==
- Danny Elfman
- Graeme Revell
- Lalo Schifrin

== Notes ==
- ^{^a} Contains Theme from Mission: Impossible by Lalo Schifrin
- ^{^b} Contains "The Plot" by Lalo Schifrin
