= Long Shot (TV program) =

Canadian current affairs television program

- Genre: Current affairs
- Country of origin: Canada
- Original language: English
- No. of seasons: 1

Production
- Producer: Ross McLean

Original release
- Network: CBC Television
- Release: 28 June – 27 September 1959

Long Shot is a Canadian current affairs television program that aired on CBC Television in 1959.

== Premise ==
Ross McLean, previously of Tabloid, produced this program which combined interviews with humour. Career broadcaster Ward Cornell and Toronto Symphony Orchestra cellist Olga Kwasniak were its hosts. Guests ranged from writers to wrestlers, including Bob and Ray, Boxcar Betty, Gregory Clark, Jack Douglas, Harry Golden, Gene Kiniski, C. Northcote Parkinson, Hard Boiled Haggerty, Jonathan Winters and Yukon Eric.

== Scheduling ==
This half-hour program was broadcast Sundays at 10:30 p.m. from 28 June to 27 September 1959 as a mid-year replacement for Fighting Words.
