= Violin Concerto (Elfman) =

Music Concert

Violin Concerto "Eleven Eleven"
- by Danny Elfman
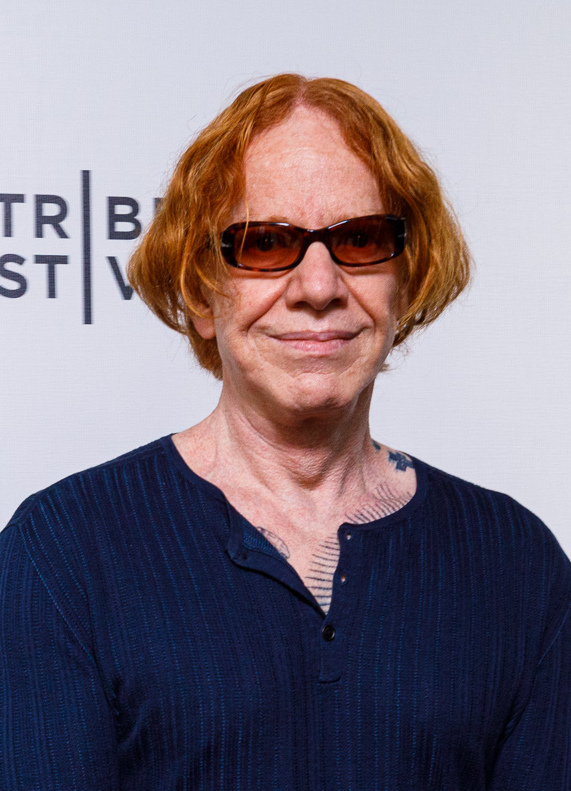
- Danny Elfman in 2022
- Genre: Classical
- Form: Violin Concerto
- Commissioned by: Czech National Symphony Orchestra, Stanford Live at Stanford University and the Royal Scottish National Orchestra
- Composed: 2016 – 2017: Los Angeles, CA
- Performed: June 21, 2017: Smetana Hall, Prague
- Published: 2017, Faber Music
- Movements: Four

The Concerto for Violin and Orchestra "Eleven Eleven" is the first violin concerto written by American composer Danny Elfman. Co-commissioned by the Czech National Symphony Orchestra, Stanford Live at Stanford University, and the Royal Scottish National Orchestra, the piece premiered at Smetana Hall in Prague, on June 21, 2017, with Sandy Cameron on violin and John Mauceri conducting the Czech National Symphony Orchestra. In 2019, the premiere recording of the concerto featured Cameron with Mauceri conducting the Royal Scottish National Orchestra.

The title "Eleven Eleven" comes from the fact that the piece has 1,111 bars of music.

== Structure ==
The work is in four movements:

1. Grave. Animato
2. Spietato
3. Fantasma
4. Giacoso. Lacrimae

In the CD liner notes, Elfman writes that the first and fourth movements share thematic material, and the second and third movements move in distinctly different directions for added contrast.

== Instrumentation ==
The work calls for solo violin and orchestra of 3 flutes (3rd doubling piccolo), 2 oboes, cor anglais, 2 clarinets, 2 bass clarinets, 3 bassoons (3rd doubling contrabassoon), 4 horns, 3 trumpets, 2 tenor trombones, bass trombone, tuba (doubling cimbasso), harp, celesta, strings (with violins I and II played antiphonally), and percussion including bass drum (with cymbal attachment), chimes, claves, cymbals, glockenspiel (printed c3-C6 range), suspended cymbals (large, medium and small), tam-tam, tambourine (mounted, no head), timpani, tom-toms (8 inch, 10 inch, 12 and 14 inch), triangle, vibraphone, woodblocks (piccolo, high, medium, low), and xylophone.

== Reception ==
Discussing influences on Elfman's violin concerto in their review of the recording, Gramophone points to the "spiky, mordant humour" of Prokofiev in the first movement and the "darkly lyric minimalism of Shostakovich" in the third movement, noting "the exhilarating climax of the finale shows his prowess and relish for the big gesture but also a deeper instinct by resisting the big finish and returning to the lachrymose beginnings of the piece."

In their review of a performance by the Buffalo Philharmonic Orchestra in October 2019, Buffalo News described the concerto as "a massive four-movement work, drawing musical influences from Shostakovich, Tchaikovsky, Ravel and others," but noted that the piece also encompasses hallmarks of Elfman's film music "like quirky melodies, hauntingly beautiful harmonies, menacing low brass blasts, bone-rattling cackles from mallet percussion and plucked strings."

The Seattle Post-Intelligencer wrote that though Elfman's roots in composing for the cinema are evident, the piece "paints pictures with pure sound" noting "Bernstein-esque jazziness, and artful integration of bells and other percussion."

Reviewing a performance by the Virginia Symphony Orchestra in September 2018, the Virginia Gazette called the piece "dramatic, lyrical, highly rhythmic, percussive (especially given its unusual cadenza-like back and forth between the violin and percussion), thoughtful and playful."
