= Shirley Walker =

American film and television composer (1945–2006)

Background information
- Born: Shirley Anne Rogers; April 10, 1945; Napa, California, U.S.
- Died: November 30, 2006 (aged 61) Reno, Nevada, U.S.
- Genre: Film scores
- Occupations: Composer, conductor, orchestrator, music arranger
- Instrument: Keyboards
- Years active: 1979–2006
- Spouse: Don Walker (m. 1967; died 2006)
- Website: Official site

Shirley Anne Walker (née Rogers; April 10, 1945 – November 30, 2006) was an American film and television composer and conductor. She was one of the few female film score composers working in Hollywood during her career. Walker was one of the first female composers to earn a solo score credit on a major Hollywood motion picture (preceded by Suzanne Ciani for 1981's The Incredible Shrinking Woman) and according to the Los Angeles Times, is remembered as a pioneer for women in the film industry.

Walker often wrote her film scores entirely by hand, and always orchestrated and conducted her own scores herself.

She won two Emmy Awards during her career, while the ASCAP Shirley Walker Award was created in her honor in 2014.

== Early life ==
Walker (née Rogers) was born in Napa, California, on April 10, 1945. Her father was an industrial patternmaker for the U.S. Navy, and her mother gave piano lessons while raising five children. She grew up in Napa Valley and Contra Costa County. She attended Pleasant Hill High School. Walker was a musical prodigy. She had an early start performing as a teenager at various hotels, jazz and art bands in 1964-1967. Walker was also a piano soloist with the San Francisco Symphony during high school, and later attended San Francisco State University on a piano scholarship. She studied music composition under Roger Nixon and piano studies with Harald Logan of Berkeley, California.

== Career ==
=== Early career ===
Shortly after graduating from Pleasant Hill High School, Walker composed the score for a full length musical adaptation of Moliere's The Imaginary Invalid called Make Way For Love, with book & lyrics by W. Grant Gray. It had its world premiere at the high school, with Shirley playing keyboards with a quartet at all performances.

For several years, she wrote jingles and composed for industrial films. Walker's career in film began in 1979, when she was hired to play the synthesizers on Carmine Coppola's score for Apocalypse Now. Her work and arrangements can be heard, eerily interwoven throughout the film, notably during cues like “Do Lung” and “The Delta”. Almost immediately, she would work again with Coppola, orchestrating the score for The Black Stallion (1979) as well as writing additional cues, receiving credits such as “Additional music by” or even “Co-composed by”. This gave her an official start and made her one of the rare and few female film composers of the time alongside Wendy Carlos, Rachel Elkind, Delia Derbyshire, Angela Morley, and Suzanne Ciani. However, what made Walker stand out among her peers was her ability to work with an orchestra and this talent would come to shape many beloved film scores.

=== Conducting, orchestrating/arranging, scoring for film and TV ===
Her apprenticeship in film music included working as orchestrator and conductor with a substantial list of established film composers such as Danny Elfman, Hans Zimmer, Brad Fiedel, Mark Snow and Carter Burwell. It is not unusual to be a composer, orchestrator, or a conductor, but what is unusual is to be one that does all three, and Walker was such an example. She reportedly knew exactly how music worked, how it was written, and how (or if) it could be played by musicians. Her roles would include making sure each cue was recorded how it needed to be with the speed, tone, and musical sound design in mind, based on the composer's wishes as well as her own.

While she was still writing for television in the early 1980s, Walker would be frequently hired by other composers to orchestrate or conduct their scores. Some of these included Murder in Coweta Country (1980) for Brad Fiedel, Cujo (1983) for Charles Bernstein, and Ghost Warrior (1984) for Richard Band for which she also wrote additional music. Shirley would also team up with Band as co-composers on The Dungeonmaster (1984) and Ghoulies (1985). Walker's imprint makes these latter two scores stand out. The score for Ghoulies specifically sounds much like a classic Danny Elfman score, though it predates Walker's work with Danny, and even his very first film score for Pee-wee's Big Adventure (1985) by six months. Walker continued to score various television projects and work simultaneously as an orchestrator/conductor into the late 1980s, continuing a long-running collaboration with Brad Fiedel. Around the time of orchestrating and conducting Fiedel's score for The Accused (1988), Walker would conduct the score for Scrooged (1988), marking her first work with Danny Elfman. She would go on to orchestrate or conduct his scores for Batman (1989), Nightbreed (1990), Dick Tracy (1990), Darkman (1990), Edward Scissorhands (1990), and Article 99 (1992). Walker also composed additional cues for both Nightbreed and Dick Tracy, and unless it was Elfman regular Steve Bartek, she likely orchestrated and conducted the theme for Tales from the Crypt.

One of Walker's most important efforts was the uncredited job of conducting the score for National Lampoon's Christmas Vacation (1989). Chevy Chase, who would play the lead in John Carpenter's 1992 film Memoirs of an Invisible Man, recalled visiting a recording session for Christmas Vacation and being impressed by the conductor. She was suggested to work on Memoirs of an Invisible Man when Jack Nitzsche fell through – a landmark decision, not just because Carpenter often composed his own scores, but because it was one of the first times a female composer had a solo credit on a major studio picture. It would become Walker's first official solo film score. Walker has the distinction of being the first woman to have composed an entire symphonic score, which she also orchestrated and conducted alone. "The first two days of that score, there were a lot of people who had come to visit the scoring stage because they were here to witness this event," Walker said in an interview in a 1998 issue of Soundtrack Magazine. "I was almost in tears about that. I had to ask somebody why all those people were here, and when they told me it was just incredible." Walker later collaborated with Carpenter on Escape from L.A.

Walker served as composer for numerous productions, including films such as Willard, the first three Final Destination installments, and television series such as Falcon Crest, Space: Above and Beyond, China Beach, and The Flash. The Flash was one of many collaborations Walker did with composer Danny Elfman. While managing her working relationships with Elfman and Fiedel, Walker would mentor and collaborate with up-and-comer Hans Zimmer (who would provide synths for Mask of the Phantasm). She would orchestrate or conduct his scores for Black Rain (1989), Bird on a Wire (1990), Backdraft (1991), A League of Their Own (1992), and Toys (1992), among others. She would also collaborate with Carter Burwell at the end of her orchestrating/conducting-for-others days, including the score for Fear (1996).

She served as a Board Member (1986–1994) and Vice President (1988–1992) for The Society of Composers & Lyricists (SCL), often speaking out on behalf of composers and their working conditions. Articles and interviews are written by and about Shirley Walker in the SCL's publication, THE SCORE, a publication in print since 1986 by and about professional film/television/video game composers, songwriters and lyricists—and where Walker would speak her mind.

=== Walker's work with DC Comics ===
Walker served as composer for Batman: The Animated Series (1992–1995), Superman: The Animated Series (1996–2000), The New Batman Adventures (1997–1999), and Batman Beyond (1999–2001); setting a standard for the musical tone of the DC Animated Universe. Walker worked with Danny Elfman on many DC Comics works. She served as conductor for the film Batman, wrote most of the scores for Batman: The Animated Series using a theme inspired by Elfman's, scored the pilot and all the episodes of The Flash (the main theme was written by Elfman) and scored episodes of Batman Beyond with Michael McCuistion, Lolita Ritmanis and Kristopher Carter. Though her involvement in the DC Animated Universe ended after Beyond, several of her themes would be used in Justice League and Justice League Unlimited.

Following the success of Batman and Batman Returns (1992), Batman: The Animated Series (1992–1995) was created. Elfman composed the main theme and Walker wrote additional themes. She became one of the show's primary composers/directors. This ultimately led to Walker scoring the animated feature, Batman: Mask of the Phantasm (1993), which is still one of her most highly-regarded works. The lyrics which the choir sing throughout the Mask of the Phantasm score, often presumed to be in Latin or some similar language, are actually the names off all the orchestra members backwards, so what's being sung is essentially nonsense. Walker would continue to compose and shepherd the music of sequel series The New Batman Adventures (1997–1999) and Batman Beyond (1999–2001). She even returned to Batman on film one last time in 1995 with uncredited orchestration on Batman Forever.

Bruce Timm, who co-created Batman: The Animated Series alongside Eric Radomski, told Vulture he was watching The Flash starring John Wesley Shipp and recognized the score sounded familiar. They subsequently found out that it was Shirley Walker who was working on it. According to Timm: "I made a note as I was watching it: Who did the music? It was Shirley Walker. Did some research on Shirley Walker, found out that she had actually worked with Danny on that first Batman movie, and had orchestrated much of it. We contacted Shirley and she was happy to come in and do the show. Back then, it was almost unheard of to score every single episode of a show. Fortunately, we mentioned it to our boss, Jean [MacCurdy], and she said, 'Oh, yeah! We should totally have an original score for every episode!' That was a huge plus."

Walker was a key part of bringing characters from DC Comics to life on screen. "Though Shirley had enjoyed her stint composing for [The Flash],” notes Batman Animated, an art-book and history of the show, "she thought the last thing she wanted to do was to work on a cartoon version of Batman." Still, she met with producers for Batman: The Animated Series, and was so impressed with the direction of the show's art and the intended depth of its characters that she agreed to come onboard. Her relationship with Danny Elfman facilitated the use of that film's music in the series, though Walker also composed her own equally memorable theme. You can hear her explain the difference between the two pieces of music, the tonal sections of her Batman theme and how she would blend them together to map over the show's various moods and scenes, in a track from the soundtrack album. She would go on to work on Superman: The Animated Series and Batman Beyond, setting the musical, well, tone for the slew of DC Animated Universe shows that spun out of Batman: TAS — an interconnected cinematic universe including Static Shock, Justice League and Justice League Unlimited.

== Honors/awards ==
For her work on Batman: The Animated Series and Batman Beyond, Walker won two Daytime Emmys in 1998 and 2001, respectively.

== Personal life ==
Walker went on to marry Don Walker in 1967. Don Walker died March 2006. They had two sons Colin Walker, born 1970, and Ian Walker born shortly after in 1972.

== Death ==
Just after completing work on the feature Black Christmas and after finishing the first three scores of the Final Destination series, Shirley Walker died November 30, 2006, from complications following a stroke in Reno, Nevada. She was 61 years old. Walker is survived by her two sons, Ian and Colin.

== Legacy ==
According to fellow composer and friend Laura Karpman, Walker was among the few female composers who managed to make her mark in the highly competitive world of Hollywood scoring: "She's one of a tiny little group, and was the first one to poke through," Karpman said. "She's been an incredible mentor to a lot of men and women in Hollywood. She was an important role model." Not only did Walker compose, she also conducted, orchestrated, arranged, and oftentimes did all three. Walker had an incredible impact not only on the films and television shows she worked on, but also on the musicians she worked with. When Warner Bros. hired her in 1990 to supervise the music for Batman: The Animated Series, Walker decided to see if she "could find the next generation of orchestral film composers and give them a chance to do this work," Walker told Daily Variety in 2002. According to a statement by one of more than 30 composers Walker brought in to work on the Batman series, Walker's "determination to open doors of opportunity for aspiring composers is unrivaled in our industry." Walker not only supported up-and-coming composers in the industry, she also watched over the orchestra and ensured the musicians would not burn out. In the DVD commentary for Final Destination, Walker recounts a time when there was a problem with music being recorded for a Disney picture she was conducting. The composer and producers were sitting in the control booth, playing back the recordings and bickering, leaving the musicians idle for forty-five minutes. Rather than have them be paid to do nothing, the producers suggested to Shirley that they rehearse music not yet recorded. Walker agreed but quietly told the orchestra how she felt this was ridiculous, that she didn't want them wearing out, and she had a different plan. In this particular studio, Walker was on an elevated platform to where the orchestra was essentially hidden below and only Walker could be seen from the booth. She utilized this, and knowing that the orchestra couldn't actually be heard unless recording was in progress, she mimed conducting, waving her arms, pointing to the score, and completely putting on an act for the producers, but all the while telling jokes and keeping things light with the musicians.

Despite the fact that very few female composers had worked in Hollywood at the time of her death, Walker was not recognized during the "In Memoriam" segment of the 79th Academy Awards. Walker was considered by some to be one of the industry's most unsung talents, often overlooked in popular media even with the strides she made for women composers and her huge influence in the film industry, such as being one of the first women to receive sole composing credit on a Hollywood studio picture, on Memoirs of an Invisible Man in 1992.

However, in 2014, eight years after Walker's passing, The American Society of Composers, Authors, and Publishers (ASCAP) created the Shirley Walker Award to honor those whose achievements have contributed to the diversity of film and television music. It has been awarded to Wendy Melvoin and Lisa Coleman, Deborah Lurie, Germaine Franco, and Pinar Toprak to date.

== Film scores ==
Year	Title	Info	Limited?	Label	OOP / SOLD OUT
1979	The Black Stallion	Co-composed with Carmine Coppola; some additional scoring by: Nyle Steiner, Bill Douglass, Kenneth Nash, & George Marsh. Replaced two other composers.	1,500	Intrada Records	SOLD OUT
1981	The End of August				NO CD
1983	Touched				NO CD
1984	The Dungeonmaster	Co-composed with Richard Band		Intrada Records	
1984	Violated	Unused score			NO CD
1985	Ghoulies	Co-composed with Richard Band		Intrada Records	
1989	Nightbreed	Additional music only. Score by Danny Elfman.		MCA Records	SOLD OUT
1990	Chicago Joe and the Showgirl	As Walker stated in an interview, for legal reasons Hans Zimmer had to take credit, but she was the one who composed the score.			NO CD
1990	Pacific Heights	Additional music only. Score by Hans Zimmer.		Varèse Sarabande	SOLD OUT
1990	Strike It Rich				NO CD
1991	Born to Ride				NO CD
1991	White Fang	One cue only. Score by Hans Zimmer & Basil Poledouris.		Intrada Records	SOLD OUT
1992	Memoirs of an Invisible Man	Replaced Jack Nitzsche	No	Varèse Sarabande	OOP
1993	Batman: Mask of the Phantasm	Expanded score released in 2009	3,000	Reprise Records (1993); La La Land Records (2009)	OOP
1994	True Lies	Co-composed with Brad Fiedel		Epic Soundtrax	OOP
1996	Escape from L.A.	Co-composed with John Carpenter, and Alan Howarth	No	Milan Records	OOP (expanded score released in 2014 by La La Land Records)
1997	Turbulence	Full CD released in 2013	2,000	La La Land Records	
1999	Mystery Men	Additional music only. Majority of score by Stephen Warbeck			NO CD
2000	Final Destination	Complete score isolated on a DVD release, with commentary over parts. A shorter promotional CD-R was also issued.			NO CD
2002	Ritual				NO CD
2003	Final Destination 2	Promotional CD released.			NO CD
2003	Willard	Full album released in 2013	3,000	La La Land Records	
2006	Final Destination 3				NO CD
2006	Black Christmas	Final score before her death. Replaced Vince Lauria.			NO CD

== Television scores (partial) ==
Year	Title	Info	Limited?	Label	OOP / SOLD OUT
1980	Lou Grant	Episodes: "Guns" (season 3) "Hazard" (season 3)			NO CD
1981	Cagney & Lacey	All Episodes: "The Rapist: Part 1" "The Rapist: Part 2" "The Gimp"			NO CD
1982	Tucker's Witch	All Episodes: "Abra Cadaver" (episode six)			NO CD
1985	Berrenger's	One episode (unknown title)			NO CD
1986	Fluppy Dogs	Walt Disney Television Animation; pilot episode			NO CD
1984 to 1988	Falcon Crest	All Episodes: "Pain and Pleasure" (season 4) "The Showdown" (season 4) "The Decline" (season 4) "Echoes" (season 5) "Changing Partners" (season 5) "Inconceivable Affairs" (season 5) "Checkmate" (season 5) "Shattered Dreams" (season 5) "Finders and Losers" (season 5) "Dangerous Ground" (season 5) "Tuscany Venus" (season 8) "Suspicion" (season 8)			NO CD
1988	Knots Landing	Incomplete episodes: "The Blushing Bride"			NO CD
1990	Tiny Toons	Rejected score for one segment in an episode.			NO CD
1990	The Flash	All Episodes (season 1 only): "Pilot" "Out of Control" "Watching the Detectives" "Honor Among Thieves" "Double Trouble" "Sins of the Father" "Child's Play" "Shroud of Death" "Ghost in the Machine" "Sight Unseen" "Beat the Clock" "The Trickster" "Tina, Is That You?" "Be My Baby" "Fast Forward" "Deadly Nightshade" "Captain Cold" "Twin Streaks" "Done with Mirrors" "Good Night, Central City" "Alpha" "The Trial of the Trickster"			NO CD
1992	Batman: The Animated Series	Over 34 episodes plus second opening theme. In July, 2012, Volume 2, a 4-CD set, was issued. A third volume, also a 4-CD set, was released in 2014.	3,000	La La Land Records	SOLD OUT (re-issued July, 2012)
1994	M.A.N.T.I.S.	Rejected score, unknown episode. No other scores for the series.			NO CD
1994	Viper	All Episodes (season 1 only): "Safe as Houses" "Firehawk" "The Face" "Wheels of Fire" "Past Tense" "Scoop" "Thief of Hearts" "Crown of Thorns"			NO CD
1995	Space: Above and Beyond	Theme and all episodes.	3,000	La La Land Records	
1995	The Adventures of Captain Zoom in Outer Space				NO CD
1996	Superman: The Animated Series	Select episodes, main title theme and thematic elements.	3,000	La La Land Records	
1997	Spawn: The Animated Series	Theme and multiple episodes (possibly all of season 1)			NO CD
1997	The Love Bug				NO CD
1998	Baby Monitor: Sound of Fear				NO CD
2000	The Others				NO CD
2002	Disappearance				NO CD

== Works for other composers ==
Year	Film	Conductor	Orchestrator	Original composer	Notes
1979	The Black Stallion	No	Yes	Carmine Coppola	Also co-composer
1980	Murder in Coweta Country (TV)	Yes	No	Brad Fiedel	
1980	Amber Waves (TV)	No	Yes	John Rubinstein	
1983	Right of Way (TV)	Yes	No	Brad Fiedel	
1983	Metalstorm: The Destruction of Jared-Syn	Yes	No	Richard Band	
1983	Swordkill	Yes	Yes	Richard Band	
1983	Cujo	Yes	No	Charles Bernstein	
1984	Ragewar	Yes	No	Richard Band	
1984	Anatomy of an Illness (TV)	Yes	No	Brad Fiedel	
1986	Children of a Lesser God	Yes	Yes	Michael Convertino	
1987	Malone	No	Yes	David Newman	
1988	The Accused	Yes	Yes	Brad Fiedel	
1988	Scrooged	Yes	No	Danny Elfman	
1988	Ernest Saves Christmas	No	Yes	Mark Snow	
1988	Little Miss 4th of July (TV)	No	Yes	Mark Snow	
1989	National Lampoon's Christmas Vacation	No	No	Angelo Badalamenti	Uncredited
1989	Batman	Yes	Yes	Danny Elfman	Also co-composer
1989	Fletch Lives	Yes	No	Harold Faltermeyer	
1989	Immediate Family	Yes	No	Brad Fiedel	
1989	Red Earth, White Earth (TV)	No	Yes	Ralph Grierson	
1989	Paint It Black	Yes	Yes	Jürgen Knieper	
1989	Kill Me Again	Yes	No	William Olvis	
1989	Black Rain	Yes	Yes	Hans Zimmer	
1990	Teenage Mutant Ninja Turtles	Yes	Yes	John Du Prez	
1990	Nightbreed	Yes	Yes	Danny Elfman	Also co-composer
1990	Dick Tracy	Yes	Yes	Danny Elfman	
1990	Darkman	Yes	Yes	Danny Elfman	
1990	Edward Scissorhands	Yes	No	Danny Elfman	
1990	Defending Your Life	Yes	Yes	Michael Gore	
1990	Arachnophobia	Yes	Yes	Trevor Jones	
1990	El Diablo (TV)	Yes	Yes	William Olvis	
1990	Child's Play 2	Yes	Yes	Graeme Revell	
1990	Bird on a Wire	Yes	Yes	Hans Zimmer	
1990	Days of Thunder	Yes	Yes	Hans Zimmer	
1990	Pacific Heights	Yes	Yes	Hans Zimmer	Also co-composer
1991	The Butcher's Wife	Yes	Yes	Michael Gore	
1991	True Identity	Yes	No	Marc Marder	
1991	White Fang	Yes	Yes	Basil Poledouris & Hans Zimmer	
1991	Backdraft	Yes	Yes	Hans Zimmer	
1992	Article 99	Yes	No	Danny Elfman	
1992	Gladiator	Yes	No	Brad Fiedel	
1992	Straight Talk	Yes	No	Brad Fiedel	
1992	Radio Flyer	Yes	Yes	Hans Zimmer	
1992	A League of Their Own	Yes	Yes	Hans Zimmer	
1992	Toys	Yes	Yes	Hans Zimmer	
1993	The Real McCoy	Yes	No	Brad Fiedel	
1993	Striking Distance	Yes	Yes	Brad Fiedel	
1994	Renaissance Man	Yes	No	Hans Zimmer	
1994	True Lies	Yes	Yes	Brad Fiedel	
1995	Bad Company	No	Yes	Carter Burwell	
1995	A Goofy Movie	Yes	Yes	Carter Burwell	Burwell's score only. Don Davis orchestrated and conducted his own cues.
1995	Johnny Mnemonic	No	No	Brad Fiedel	Uncredited
1995	Batman Forever	No	No	Elliot Goldenthal	Uncredited
1995	Free Willy 2: The Adventure Home	Yes	No	Basil Poledouris	
1996	Fear	Yes	Yes	Carter Burwell	Last orchestration work for another composer.
1996	Eden	Yes	No	Brad Fiedel	
1996	Rasputin (TV)	Yes	No	Brad Fiedel	Last conducting work for another composer.
