= Serenada Schizophrana =

Studio album by Danny Elfman
- Released: October 3, 2006
- Recorded: The Newman Scoring Stage at Fox Studios
- Genre: Classical
- Length: 46:00
- Label: Sony BMG Masterworks
- Producer: Danny Elfman

Danny Elfman chronology
Corpse Bride (2005)	Serenada Schizophrana (2006)	Charlotte's Web (2006)

Professional ratings
Review scores
Source	Rating
Allmusic	link

Serenada Schizophrana is a suite of six symphonic movements written by American film composer Danny Elfman in 2004. It was commissioned by the American Composers Orchestra, which premiered the work at Carnegie Hall in New York City on February 23, 2005, conducted by Stephen Sloane. A studio recording was released on October 3, 2006, with John Mauceri conducting the Hollywood Studio Symphony orchestra. Album art was done by George Condo.

The music was used in the soundtrack for the 2006 IMAX film Deep Sea 3D. The movements "Pianos" and "Blue Strings" were adapted for the soundtrack to Errol Morris's 2008 documentary Standard Operating Procedure, for which Elfman also composed the full music score.

The work is Elfman's first major classical composition.

== Movements ==
The series consists of 6 movements, running approximately 42 minutes:

1. Pianos
2. Blue Strings
3. A Brass Thing
4. The Quadruped Patrol
5. "I Forget"
6. Bells and Whistles

The 2006 recording also consists of two extra tracks following the work: "End Tag" and "Improv for Alto Sax". The tracks are respectively listed as the seventh track and a bonus track.

The movement "I Forget" features Spanish lyrics by Claudia Brant and Livia Corona sung by female solo voice and chorus.

== Instrumentation ==
Serenada Schizophrana is scored for the following large orchestra and chorus:

- Woodwinds: four flutes (second doubling alto flute, third doubling piccolo), three oboes (third doubling English horn), three clarinets in B♭ (first doubling clarinet in E♭, second doubling bass clarinet in B♭, third doubling bass clarinet in B♭ and alto saxophone in E♭), three bassoons (third doubling contrabassoon)
- Brass: six horns in F, three trumpets in B♭ (first doubling piccolo trumpet), three trombones (third doubling bass trombone), one bass trombone (doubling contrabass trombone), one tuba (doubling cimbasso)
- Percussion (6 players): timpani, snare drum, two bass drums, tambourine, vibraphone, xylophone, wood blocks (piccolo, high, and low), cymbals (crash, Chinese, suspended, hi-hat), tubular bells, temple blocks, shakers (metal, rattlesnake, wood), glockenspiel, claves, tom-toms, two marimbas
- Keyboards: two pianos (second doubling synthesizer), one synthesizer
- Strings: a harp, fourteen first and twelve second violins, eight violas, eight violoncellos, six double basses
- Voices (in "The Quadruped Patrol" and "I Forget" only): two women's chorus (SSA)

== Composition ==
In the liner notes for the 2006 CD recording, Elfman writes: "I began composing several dozen short improvisational compositions, maybe a minute each. Slowly, some of them began to develop themselves until finally I had six separate movements that, in some abstract, absurd way, felt connected."

He goes on to list the following influences for Serenada Schizophrana and his work in general: Bernard Herrmann, Nino Rota, Dimitri Tiomkin, Max Steiner, Erich Korngold, Sergei Prokofiev, Igor Stravinsky, Béla Bartók, Dmitri Shostakovich, Carl Orff, Kurt Weill, Duke Ellington, Harry Partch and Philip Glass.

== Reception ==
Both the 2005 premiere and subsequent 2006 recording of Serenada Schizophrana received favorable response from critics. After the premiere performance, The New York Times called the piece "music that works. With six movements, rolling piano solos (by Christopher Oldfather) and the charming hoots and chirps of eight female voices (the ACO Singers under Judith Clurman), Mr. Elfman gave us music comfortable in its own world and highly professional in its execution... The composer of this piece has an ear for symphonic colors and how to balance them."

Film Score Monthly hailed the CD release as "a freewheeling six-movement composition for full orchestra that forever teeters between the worlds of scowling academia and impish rebellion... perfectly balanced... Serenada Schizophrana sparkles with orchestral color and energy..." Soundtrack.Net called it "a musical roller coaster ride through various little set pieces and landscapes, containing at times the orchestral majesty of Elfman's early career, his minimalist phase, and his more recent bouts of complex overlapping constructions and controlled dissonance."
