= Article 99 =

1992 film by Howard Deutch

- Home video release poster
- Directed by: Howard Deutch
- Written by: Ron Cutler
- Produced by: Michael Gruskoff; Michael I. Levy
- Starring: Ray Liotta; Kiefer Sutherland; Forest Whitaker; Lea Thompson; John Mahoney; John C. McGinley; Keith David; Kathy Baker
- Cinematography: Richard Bowen
- Edited by: Richard Halsey; Colleen Halsey
- Music by: Danny Elfman
- Distributed by: Orion Pictures
- Release dates: February 26, 1992 (Washington, D.C.); March 13, 1992 (United States)
- Running time: 100 minutes
- Country: United States
- Language: English
- Budget: $20 million
- Box office: $6.4 million

Article 99 is a 1992 American comedy-drama film directed by Howard Deutch and written by Ron Cutler. It was produced by Orion Pictures, and stars Ray Liotta, Kiefer Sutherland, Forest Whitaker, Lea Thompson, John Mahoney, John C. McGinley, Keith David, Kathy Baker and Eli Wallach. The soundtrack was composed by Danny Elfman.

The plot centers on a veterans hospital where the doctors defy the bureaucratic administration in order to assist the underserved patients. The film's title supposedly refers to a legal loophole, which states that unless an illness/injury is related to military service, a veteran is not eligible for VA hospital benefits.

== Plot ==
Peter Morgan, a young doctor, begins a new job at Monument Heights Veterans' Hospital in Washington, D.C. The government-funded hospital is suffering from cutbacks upheld by Executive Director Dr. Henry Dreyfoos. Morgan intends to work at the hospital temporarily before starting a private practice. On his first day, Morgan finds himself out of his depth amidst the chaos. One of the patients, veteran 'Shooter' Polaski, snaps after receiving an Article 99 form, which states the hospital finds the patient ineligible for immediate treatment because the supposed ailment is not service-related. Polaski proceeds to drive through the hospital's entrance and starts a shooting rampage with his M16. A group of doctors led by Dr. Richard Sturgess is able to disarm Polaski.

After this traumatic incident, Sturgess takes Morgan under his wing. Sturgess, along with his colleagues Rudy Bobrick, Sid Handleman, and Robin Van Dorn, are defiant of Dreyfoos' belt-tightening policies. Sturgess conducts midnight raids on medical supply rooms and tries to recruit Morgan, but Morgan refuses, fearing repercussions for his medical career.

Meanwhile, Morgan befriends World War II veteran Sam Abrams, who is considered by the hospital a 'gomer'—a person who cannot be admitted even with a critical condition and has to be constantly moved around so administration will not discharge him. Abrams' bond with Morgan causes the new doctor to increasingly grow discontent with the hospital's conditions.

Overhearing Dreyfoos' phone conversation, Morgan learns that a new shipment of cardiac surgery tools is stored in the pathology department. He relays this information to Sturgess, who conducts a midnight raid to obtain the tools. However, this turns out to be a trap set by Dreyfoos, who films the theft and blackmails Sturgess into voluntary suspension and a declaration of guilt if charges are brought. Shortly after, Abrams passes away, heavily affecting Morgan as he feels he failed his patient. Morgan eventually finds Dreyfoos' film and, infuriated by being used as bait, declares open rebellion against Dreyfoos, resulting in his own suspension.

Morgan and Sturgess, along with wiseguy veteran Luther Jerome, begin planning a hostile takeover to properly attend to the patients without interference from the administration. The veterans successfully lock out the security guards while Dreyfoos is away. Police gather outside but cannot remove the veterans as the hospital is under federal jurisdiction. News of the standoff reaches the FBI and the Inspector General, who arrives to assess the situation. The Inspector General attempts to negotiate with Luther, but Luther stands his ground as the veterans unfurl a massive banner in the hospital stating 'No Surrender'.

The FBI prepares to retake the hospital by force, cutting off the power and issuing a final warning. Sturgess convinces Luther to lay down resistance and reopen the hospital. The Inspector General and Dreyfoos enter the building and attempt to arrest Morgan, but Morgan stands his ground. The Inspector General discloses he himself is a Vietnam veteran and, acknowledging the situation the hospital is facing, he suspends Dreyfoos from hospital management. Morgan decides to become a permanent resident in Monument Heights as no prosecutions are made.

The victory is sadly short-lived, as Dreyfoos' unnamed replacement decides to continue Dreyfoos' previous policies. Morgan and Sturgess vow to take a stand against the 'new' administration.

== Cast ==
- Ray Liotta as Dr. Richard Sturgess
- Kiefer Sutherland as Dr. Peter Morgan
- Forest Whitaker as Dr. Sid Handleman
- Lea Thompson as Dr. Robin Van Dorn
- John C. McGinley as Dr. Rudy Bobrick
- John Mahoney as Dr. Henry Dreyfoos
- Keith David as Luther Jerome
- Kathy Baker as Dr. Diana Walton
- Eli Wallach as Sam Abrams
- Troy Evans as Pat Travis
- Noble Willingham as Inspector General
- Lynne Thigpen as Nurse White
- Jeffrey Tambor as Dr. Leo Krutz
- Leo Burmester as Shooter Polaski
- Rutanya Alda as Ann Travis

== Production ==
Screenwriter Ron Cutler incorporated real-life events into the script. A scene depicted in the film of a veteran crashing his car into a hospital actually happened at the West Los Angeles VA Medical Center in 1981.

The movie was filmed in Kansas City, Missouri. To create the fictional Memorial Heights Veterans' Hospital, the production leased three floors in an older wing of the Trinity Lutheran Hospital.

== Release ==
Article 99 was originally set for a 1991 release, but was delayed by its studio Orion Pictures' bankruptcy proceedings. In February 1992, it was reported that Orion was cleared by its creditors to release Article 99 and Shadow and Fog that year. The film had its world premiere in Washington, D.C. on February 26, 1992. The event, a benefit for homeless veterans, was hosted by Congressman Lane Evans, chair of the House Subcommittee on Veterans's Affairs. The film was theatrically released in North America on March 13, 1992.

The film earned $2.46 million ($5.65 million in today's terms) in its opening weekend (March 13, 1992), screening in 1,262 theaters, and ranking it as the number 6 film of that weekend. It earned a total domestic gross of $6.38 million ($14.6 million in today's terms).

== Critical reception ==
The film received mixed reviews and has a rating of 47% based on 15 reviews on review aggregate site Rotten Tomatoes. Audiences surveyed by CinemaScore gave the film a grade "B+" on scale of A to F.

With its humorous take on veterans' issues, the film was compared to Robert Altman's film M*A*S*H. In The Austin Chronicle, Marc Savlov wrote, "Like Robert Altman's M*A*S*H, Article 99 aspires to be another anti-establishment film, rallying not against the Army itself, but instead the Veterans Administration, that sometimes shady mountain of bureaucracy, red tape, and steadfast inefficiency that purports to assist American vets with their medical needs. Unlike Altman's film, though, director Deutch (Pretty in Pink, Some Kind of Wonderful) takes the easy way out, stuffing his film with flat characters, stock situations, and ill-timed, unleavened gags that are reminiscent of the worst episodes of the M*A*S*H television show."

Roger Ebert of the Chicago Sun-Times said that while the film's message about veterans' treatment by the government is a noble one, its sitcom-like structure results in a tonal mismatch. Ebert wrote, "The filmmakers have obviously studied not only 'MASH' (the movie) but also such quip-a-minit TV shows as 'Hill Street Blues' and 'St. Elsewhere,' and they have taken those formulas and mixed them up with some social outrage. They want to make a comedy with a heart, but it just doesn’t feel right."

== See also ==
- Walter Reed Army Medical Center neglect scandal
- Coming Home
- Born on the Fourth of July
