= Wisdom (film) =

1986 film by Robert Wise, Emilio Estevez

- Theatrical release poster
- Directed by: Emilio Estevez
- Written by: Emilio Estevez
- Produced by: Bernard Williams
- Starring: Emilio Estevez; Demi Moore; Tom Skerritt; Veronica Cartwright
- Cinematography: Adam Greenberg
- Edited by: Michael Kahn
- Music by: Danny Elfman
- Production company: Gladden Entertainment
- Distributed by: 20th Century Fox (United States); Cannon Films (International)
- Release dates: December 31, 1986 (premiere); January 2, 1987
- Running time: 109 minutes
- Country: United States
- Language: English
- Budget: $6.5 million
- Box office: $5.7 million or $1.5 million

Wisdom is a 1986 American romantic crime film written and directed by its star Emilio Estevez in his filmmaking debut. The film also stars Demi Moore, along with Tom Skerritt and Veronica Cartwright as Estevez's parents. The ending credits song is "Home Again" by Oingo Boingo and the score by Danny Elfman.

The film is dedicated to the memory of Henry Proach, who was a good friend of Estevez, and who appears briefly in the picture.

== Plot ==
John Wisdom is a young man just out of high school. On the night of his high school graduation, he gets drunk and steals a car.

With a grand theft auto conviction he is branded a felon, and as a result cannot hold down a decent job. Seeing no future for himself, Wisdom takes a left turn: he decides to become a criminal "for the people", evocative of Robin Hood.

After seeing news reports about impoverished farmers and working class people losing their employment, Wisdom goes on a bank robbing spree with his girlfriend, Karen Simmons. He had planned to operate alone, but she insists on giving him a ride on the first job, and therefore inadvertently becomes his accomplice.

They do not steal money, but rather erase loan and mortgage records, buying time for the poor to pay their debts. At a small motel, the owner recognises them. Not able to keep it to himself, he and half a dozen people come to thank them, bearing gifts including a new vehicle.

However, the FBI is after them. Agents shoot up the motel at which the couple had been staying, only to find that Wisdom and Karen are already gone.

A panicky Karen eventually kills a local sheriff who recognises her in a convenience store. She and Wisdom make a run for the Canada–United States border, but when Karen is shot by a police helicopter, Wisdom leaves her in the care of a group of high school students and their teacher.

Wisdom resumes his flight on foot on the school grounds, unloading his gun before he is surrounded by police and federal agents at the football field. As he appears to be reaching for his gun, he is riddled with gunfire and dies.

John wakes up where the film started, in his parents' bathroom. He emerges from the bathtub and proceeds to get ready for his job interview. His entire story has apparently been a daydream.

== Cast ==
- Emilio Estevez as John Wisdom
- Demi Moore as Karen Simmons
- Tom Skerritt as Lloyd Wisdom
- Veronica Cartwright as Samantha Wisdom
- William Allen Young as Agent Williamson
- Richard Minchenberg as Agent Cooper
- Ernie Brown as Bill, Motel manager
- Charlie Sheen as City Burger manager

== Production ==
Estevez says that the idea for the film "started as just the title. I thought it would be great visually. Just 'Wisdom' across the screen."

He wrote the first draft in three weeks. Wisdom became the surname of the lead character. Estevez says that Wisdom is "without a place in society... He becomes a criminal because he feels it's the only thing society has left him to do."

Estevez added that the film was basically "about two people – their relationship and their discoveries. Those discoveries leave Wisdom not only wanted dead or alive in five states, but also a modern-day folk hero."

In October 1985 David Begelman's Gladden Entertainment announced that it had signed a deal with the 23 year old Estevez to write, produce and direct Wisdom. Estevez had previously written That Was Then This is Now. Begelman had been in charge of Columbia, and MGM, during which time he gave Walter Hill, Barry Levinson and Richard Benjamin their first directing jobs.

Comparisons were made with Orson Welles who was 24 when he wrote, produced and directed Citizen Kane. Estevez said "if they promote Wisdom as this most phenomenal thing that hasn't happened since Orson Welles, I'm going to get hit."

"I have a kind of nihilistic point of view", he added. "I'm into making films that are realistic and not fluff. When you deal in reality, you're dealing with a lot of serious problems. We could be sitting here and now and being vaporized by nuclear weapons by accidentally. That's reality... Life does not end happily ever after."

The female lead went to Demi Moore who was then Estevez's fiancée. (The two met while making St Elmo's Fire.)

"I'm not going to sit here and say it was the most positive professional move for me when I made that picture", she said later. "Of course, doing it was based on my feelings for him and my desire to share it with him. It was very special. I was around from the day Emilio wrote the first page. I would read every page, and we would talk. The attachment to the project was real."

The Gladden Entertainment Company suggested Robert Wise be hired to work as "executive director" (mentor) and Estevez agreed. Wise said, "I was there to be an aid to him if he wanted to discuss something or whether he felt this kind of angle or editing standpoint was a good one, whether the different angles in a scene were enough coverage. I didn't ever step in when he was staging a scene. Then if I saw something that bothered me, I would get him aside and say, 'Be careful of this or watch for that. Be careful, I think you have her looking the wrong way in this shot.' Mainly technical things. We would discuss the pacing of scenes. And that would be primarily it."

The film was finished $200,000 under budget and a day ahead of schedule.

It was one of the first film scores from Danny Elfman.

"In a way, it's a very subversive film", Estevez said. "A lot of people are angered by the message it gives the kids: If you want something changed, then pick up a gun and change it. But if they stay until the end, they'll realize that violence doesn't solve anything. I'm going to take a beating on this one. "I can see myself getting my feet wet as a director, and there's a choppiness, an awkwardness to it. It's not totally relaxed. I made the movie first for myself, and I think just getting it done is an accomplishment. I fought my battle in just getting it done, and being the youngest person to get it done. Not that I set out to break any kind of record or anything, or to prove to anybody that I could do it."

== Reception ==
The film received negative reviews from critics: Leonard Maltin considered it "wretchedly scripted, with one of the most self-defeating wrap-ups you'll ever see." Gene Siskel called the film "a dim-witted remake of 'Bonnie and Clyde'" with "plenty of shots of Estevez and gun moll Moore tearing up paper records[, which] however, turns out to be the least of the film's faults, because if you stick around for the ending you will receive a surprise that will have you hissing the screen." Audiences polled by CinemaScore gave the film an average grade of "C+" on an A+ to F scale. A more positive review of the film came from the United Kingdom, where it was released directly to video, as Michael Perry of the Manchester Evening News said it was "a well-made and, at times, entertaining yarn that owes much to such figures of folklore as Robin Hood and Bonnie and Clyde—although I doubt that John Wisdom will have quite their longevity." Film review site Metacritic reported an average score of 37 out of 9 reviews, indicating "generally unfavorable reviews".

Estevez later said the film "was a very disappointing experience – the outcome of it. I shouldn't say disappointing. I should say devastating – the response, how it was received. I tell you what: It was not a great film, but it was a good film. And I believe that now... I think if I show an area of weakness, it's in the writing and in the structure of my writing. I think I need to get an objective point of view."

Moore and Estevez broke up not long after the film's release. She later recalled "there was a strong lash-out against Emilio. I can't get in the skins of those people who wrote what they wrote... I thought he did a great job and that his directing was very strong for someone who had never done this before."

"I took a beating from critics and I took it personally", said Estevez later. "I was broken for a period of time. But I've learned you really can't take it personally. . . . Making a film at that age was winning the battle. Having it released was icing on the cake."

Estevez added "I learned that you don't go into a project with a script that's not ready. You've got to have all the bugs worked out before you start... I also learned how to be more economical with my shots and with my time... [I was] like a kid in a candy store. When you're 23 and somebody hands you $4.5 million and tells you to go out and make a film, there will be some excesses."

== Home media ==
In 2009, Warner Bros. released Wisdom on DVD through its "Warner Archive" burn-on-demand service.

== See also ==
- 1986 in film
- Cinema of the United States
- List of American films of 1986
