= Alibi (Vinyl) =

- Vinyl episode
- Episode no.: Episode 10
- Directed by: Allen Coulter
- Written by: Terence Winter
- Cinematography by: Reed Morano
- Editing by: Tim Streeto
- Original release date: April 17, 2016
- Running time: 51 minutes

Guest appearances
- Annie Parisse as Andrea "Andie" Zito; Douglas Smith as Gary / Xavier; Bo Dietl as Joe Corso; Armen Garo as Corrado Galasso; Michael Drayer as Detective Renk; Jason Cottle as Detective Whorisky; David Vadim as Hilly Kristal; Susan Heyward as Cece; Emily Tremaine as Heather; Ephraim Sykes as Marvin; MacKenzie Meehan as Penny; Griffin Newman as Casper

Episode chronology
← Previous "Rock and Roll Queen"	Next → —

"Alibi" is the tenth and final episode of the American period drama television series Vinyl. The episode was written by series creator Terence Winter, and directed by executive producer Allen Coulter. It originally aired on HBO on April 17, 2016.

The series is set in New York City in the 1970s. It focuses on Richie Finestra, American Century Records founder and president, whose passion for music and discovering talent has gone by the wayside. With his American Century Records on the verge of being sold, a life-altering event rekindles Finestra's professional fire, but it may leave his personal life in ruins. In the episode, Richie works with the authorities in order to take Galasso down.

According to Nielsen Media Research, the episode was seen by an estimated 0.730 million household viewers and gained a 0.20 ratings share among adults aged 18–49. The episode received mixed reviews from critics, with praise to the closure to the Galasso storyline, but criticism towards the characters, narrative and pacing.

The series was originally renewed for a second season in February 2016. However, on June 22, 2016, HBO reversed its decision, making the episode the series finale.

== Plot ==
Richie (Bobby Cannavale) meets with the Assistant U.S. Attorney to accept the deal in taking Galasso (Armen Garo) down. However, he is informed that the deal does not grant him protection. During this, Zak (Ray Romano) meets with Galasso, trying to get him in helping him in taking Richie out of American Century.

Galasso and his right-hand man, Tony Del Greco, visit American Century's offices. Galasso reveals that Zak betrayed Richie, and he does not intend to help Zak in his request. He warns them to maintain the peace, also disclosing that he owns part of the Yankee Stadium as a front. This conversation is recorded for the detectives, and is used to arrest many of his associates. Meanwhile, Skip (J. C. MacKenzie), Scott (P. J. Byrne) and Julie (Max Casella) discover that the disco music is performing extremely well, as Clark (Jack Quaid) and Jorge (Christian Navarro) have convinced many clubs in using their CDs.

As the Nasty Bits prepare for their performance at the Academy of Music, Kip (James Jagger) feels more distant from Jamie (Juno Temple) following their threesome with Alex. When Jamie claims she loves Alex, Kip decides to abandon the band and evict her from his apartment. Jamie asks Richie for help, but he demands that she find her way out of it.

Richie and Zak are summoned to a warehouse by Galasso, who is angry about the arrests in his front. He is convinced they had a role in the raid, as it happened in close proximity to their discussion at the office. Richie then blames Corso (Bo Dietl) for the raid, who in turn confesses about Buck Rogers' death. Del Greco murders Corso and spares Richie and Zak. Richie asks Lester (Ato Essandoh) to use one of his songs as he is still the credited owner, forced to pay a substantial amount of money.

Lester and Jamie get to Kip's apartment, finding that he overdosed. They are forced to shower him and get him in time for the Nasty Bits' performance. Richie manages to get Kip revived in time, but fires Jamie for her role in the band's problems. The Nasty Bits fail to incite excitement in the crowd, but attract interest when the police arrive to stop the event for their controversial lyrics, which was planned by Richie. Richie then meets with his handler at a bar to disclose more information on Galasso but omitting Corso's murder. The bar owner, Hilly Kristal (David Vadim) tells Richie he plans to rename the bar to CBGB. Richie returns to the offices, where he reads a glowing review of the performance. He then states that he is officially launching Alibi Records, and invites the executives to vandalize their offices to celebrate.

== Production ==
=== Development ===
The episode was written by series creator Terence Winter, and directed by executive producer Allen Coulter. This was Winter's third writing credit, and Coulter's third directing credit.

== Reception ==
=== Viewers ===
In its original American broadcast, "Alibi" was seen by an estimated 0.730 million household viewers with a 0.20 in the 18–49 demographics. This means that 0.20 percent of all households with televisions watched the episode. This was a slight decrease in viewership from the previous episode, which was watched by 0.753 million household viewers with a 0.24 in the 18-49 demographics.

=== Critical reviews ===
"Alibi" received mixed reviews from critics. Matt Fowler of IGN gave the episode a "good" 7.4 out of 10 and wrote in his verdict, "Vinyl's season finale briefly held some suspense when it seemed like Zak might get murdered, but for the most part it was one of the smoothest seasonal pills to swallow so far. Disappointingly so, in some regards. With Devon gone completely, it felt like things maybe lined up too nicely for Richie and his revolving door of record label woes."

Alan Sepinwall of HitFix wrote, "At the end of the finale, Richie holds a party to launch American Century's sub-label, Alibi Records, and invites all the party guests to cover his office walls with graffiti – the more profane, the better – as a way to symbolize the way the company has transformed how it does business. But spray paint on the walls is only cosmetic. Both American Century and Vinyl still need a lot of work, and may never be able to escape their old reputations." Dan Caffrey of The A.V. Club gave the episode a "B–" grade and wrote, "At the rate Vinyl was going for a while, 'Alibi' could have just as easily ended in a shootout. With the drawing board now wiped clean of blood and a great deal of the coke residue, hopefully that kind of subject matter will soon be in the show’s past."

Leah Greenblatt of Entertainment Weekly wrote, "If we've learned anything about Richie Finestra by now, it's that he has an ear for talent, a knack for hustling, and a nose for uncountable kilos of cocaine. But does he really have the guts to become a narc?" Noel Murray of Vulture gave the episode a 3 star rating out of 5 and wrote, "Despite all the distractions and dead ends, Vinyl still could someday become the show that takes the power of music seriously and finds drama in the lives of the businessmen who try to tap into that power, both for profit and for their egos. 'Alibi' isn't a great season-ender, but when it's clicking, it has a clear vision. This is how a corrupt business like the record industry inspires the world."

Gavin Edwards of The New York Times wrote, "The Galasso plotlines on Vinyl have been fitfully entertaining, but they're the show's fundamental error. The creators didn't have enough faith in the entertainment value of the music business. Too often, the record label has been treated like a colorful backdrop for one more organized-crime story. Sure, there have been mobbed-up record labels in the real world — but when the series dwells on Galasso, it feels like we're eating the leftovers stashed at the back of Martin Scorsese's refrigerator." Dan Martin of The Guardian wrote, "After a season that's spent most of its time portraying Richie Finestra as a coked-out monster of a man, this finale finds him coming out as something approaching triumphant. Which rather begs the question: what was the point?"

Tony Sokol of Den of Geek gave the episode a 4.5 star rating out of 5 and wrote, "HBO's penultimate episodes are traditionally better than their finales, but 'Alibi' is a cathartic closing. A lot of this comes from the music they play. It's hard not to get caught up in the energy of the music and let that add to the excitement of the victory. Sure, I'm gonna miss Bo Dietl, but it was worth it just to see the office repainted." Robert Ham of Paste wrote, "Nor did the big victories in this episode feel earned or exciting. I've long since ceased caring about the fate of Indigo, or the two dudes pimping their records to the DJs of New York. And the big moment with the Nasty Bits was just plain stupid. For a show based in a rich cultural goldmine in one of the most amazing cities in the world... Vinyl is tone deaf, dumb, and blind."
