= Pilot (Vinyl) =

- Vinyl episode
- Episode no.: Episode 1
- Directed by: Martin Scorsese
- Story by: Rich Cohen; Mick Jagger; Martin Scorsese; Terence Winter
- Teleplay by: Terence Winter; George Mastras
- Cinematography by: Rodrigo Prieto
- Editing by: David Tedeschi
- Original release date: February 14, 2016
- Running time: 113 minutes

Guest appearances
- Andrew Dice Clay as Frank "Buck" Rogers; Ian Hart as Peter Grant; Susan Heyward as Cece; Emily Tremaine as Heather; Bo Dietl as Joe Corso; Armen Garo as Corrado Galasso; Ephraim Sykes as Marvin; MacKenzie Meehan as Penny; Griffin Newman as Casper; Frank Van Putten as Von Kinkel; Jill Larson as Bellamy; Zebedee Row as Robert Plant; Anna Sherbinina as Irina

Episode chronology
← Previous —	Next → "Yesterday Once More"

"Pilot" is the series premiere of the American period drama television series Vinyl. The episode was written by Terence Winter and George Mastras from a story by Rich Cohen, Mick Jagger, Martin Scorsese and Winter, and directed by Scorsese. It originally aired on HBO on February 14, 2016.

The series is set in New York City in the 1970s. It focuses on Richie Finestra, American Century Records founder and president, whose passion for music and discovering talent has gone by the wayside. With his American Century Records on the verge of being sold, a life-altering event rekindles Finestra's professional fire, but it may leave his personal life in ruins.

According to Nielsen Media Research, the episode was seen by an estimated 0.764 million household viewers and gained a 0.2 ratings share among adults aged 18–49. The episode received generally positive reviews from critics, with praise towards Scorsese's directing and performances, but criticism towards the writing, runtime and pacing.

== Plot ==
In New York City 1973, Richie Finestra (Bobby Cannavale) buys a quarter of cocaine from a local drug dealer. After snorting in his car, he calls a police detective named Eric Voehel. However, he hangs up when he is distracted by a crowd of people rushing to the Mercer Arts Center. He enters the building, and is fascinated when the New York Dolls play "Personality Crisis".

Five days earlier, Richie travels to Germany to represent his label American Century Records in a potential deal with PolyGram executives. He is joined by his head of promotions Zak Yankovich (Ray Romano), and his head of sales Skip Fontaine (J. C. MacKenzie). Richie hopes to sell the company, with an impending distribution agreement with Led Zeppelin part of the package. However, upon returning to New York, Richie gets confronted by Robert Plant (Zebedee Row) as their royalty shares were cut in half without warning. This also angers Zeppelin's manager, Peter Grant (Ian Hart), for not consulting him on the deal.

Richie visits station owner Frank "Buck" Rogers (Andrew Dice Clay), who refuses to play songs by the label after Donny Osmond insulted him. Accompanied with promoter Joe Corso (Bo Dietl), Richie tries to convince Buck in signing back with them. However, he is taken aback by Buck, who is heavily intoxicated. When he makes an advance on Richie, both men fight until Corso kills Buck by hitting him in the head. Now both involved in murder, they dump the body elsewhere in an attempt to pass it as a failed drug deal.

Jamie Vine (Juno Temple), an assistant at American Century's A&R Department, tries to get to sign a band, Nasty Bits, after meeting the lead singer, Kip Stevens (James Jagger). She schedules a performance, but the crowd hates the band for its proto-punk sound, prompting the band members to fight the attendees. Afterwards, Jamie tries to convince Kip in changing his sound, but he is adamant in sticking with his style.

As PolyGram is ready to accept the buyout, Detective Eric Voehel wants to question Richie, leaving him his card to call him. Richie panics when Buck's body is found by the police, causing him to break his sobriety to distract him. His wife, Devon (Olivia Wilde), finds him and scolds him for his actions. Back to the opening scene, Richie continues staring at the New York Dolls performing. Suddenly, the walls in the building start shaking and the building collapses due to the capability and performance. Richie emerges from the rubble and leaves smiling as police sirens are heard approaching.

In flashbacks to the 1960s, Richie works at a nightclub, where he is fascinated by singer Lester Grimes (Ato Essandoh). He convinces him in making him his manager, signing him with a record company. However, the company owner demands that Lester drop his blues style and that he now records under the name "Little Jimmy Little." Richie intends to form his own record company and take Lester with him, but his share is bought by Corrado Galasso (Armen Garo), a powerful gangster, who decides to keep Lester. During a fight with Corrado, Lester gets his throat damaged, killing his career.

== Production ==
=== Development ===
In February 2016, HBO announced that the first episode of the series would be titled "Pilot", and that it would be written by Terence Winter and George Mastras from a story by Rich Cohen, Mick Jagger, Martin Scorsese and Winter, and directed by Scorsese.

== Reception ==
=== Viewers ===
In its original American broadcast, "Pilot" was seen by an estimated 0.764 million household viewers with a 0.2 in the 18–49 demographics. This means that 0.2 percent of all households with televisions watched the episode.

=== Critical reviews ===
"Pilot" received generally positive reviews from critics. Matt Fowler of IGN gave the episode a "great" 8 out of 10 and wrote in his verdict, "Vinyl isn't a home run out of the gate, though it gives us a lot to work with/sift through while also hoping we become as enamored with classic rock as its creators are. Basically, this is music-fan Scorsese getting to 'Cameron Crowe' it up a bit, while also maintaining some of his trademark ferociousness. Watching characters, essentially, be 'horrible to one another' can become weary, but there is a loving backbeat underneath."

Dan Caffrey of The A.V. Club gave the episode a "B" grade and wrote, "is Vinyl going to say anything beyond 'This was real music, maaan' in its coming episodes? Then again, how much is there left to say about a genre whose heyday is almost universally recognized as being legendary and impactful? With that in mind, Vinyl functions best when it doesn't try and make a grand statement about rock music at all, but rather the inner conflicts caused by a field where art is always being converted into commerce."

Leah Greenblatt of Entertainment Weekly wrote, "So he rises, shakes it off, and lurches away like an extra-resilient survivor of the zombie apocalypse, plaster-strewn and smiling. Richie will live to see another day, and we will get another episode." Noel Murray of Vulture gave the episode a 4 star rating out of 5 and wrote, "Vinyl intends to document a time when rock and roll became sickly and cynical. But it's also about the visionaries who want to demolish the beast and salvage its best pieces — stitching back together the body, the brain, and the heart."

Gavin Edwards of The New York Times wrote, "Judging by its two-hour pilot, the show provides the thrill of nostalgia as effectively as Mad Men did: it remains to be seen whether it also has a story that's worthy of its production values." Dan Martin of The Guardian wrote, "This new rock'n'roll drama, created by Martin Scorsese and Mick Jagger, is pure culture porn – but it could do without all the gangsterisms."

Tony Sokol of Den of Geek wrote, "The pilot of HBO's Vinyl is a Martin Scorsese movie. A full movie. It clocks in at just under two hours. Mean Streets wasn't even two hours. Taxi Driver was only a minute longer than Mean Streets. King of Comedy was barely over an hour and a half. The only thing missing from Vinyl's 'Pilot', is an ending. Because it's only the beginning." Robert Ham of Paste wrote, "Well, the first episode has aired, and for as much as I enjoyed seeing Scorsese directing with the same looseness and color that marked his previous triumph The Wolf of Wall Street, the two-hour event was as absurd as those previews promised. For every detail the show got dead on with regards to the music industry, the rest felt so strained and over-the-top and often cartoonish."
