= He in Racist Fire =

- Vinyl episode
- Episode no.: Episode 5
- Directed by: Peter Sollett
- Written by: Adam Rapp
- Cinematography by: David Franco
- Editing by: Kate Sanford
- Original release date: March 13, 2016
- Running time: 50 minutes

Guest appearances
- Lena Olin as Mrs. Fineman; David Proval as Vince Finestra; Ken Marino as Jackie Jervis; Annie Parisse as Andrea "Andie" Zito; Daniel J. Watts as Hannibal; Michael Drayer as Detective Renk; Jason Cottle as Detective Whorisky; Susan Heyward as Cece; Emily Tremaine as Heather; Ephraim Sykes as Marvin; MacKenzie Meehan as Penny; Griffin Newman as Casper; Jay Klaitz as Hal Underwood

Episode chronology
← Previous "The Racket"	Next → "Cyclone"

"He in Racist Fire" is the fifth episode of the American period drama television series Vinyl. The episode was written by Adam Rapp and directed by Peter Sollett. It originally aired on HBO on March 13, 2016.

The series is set in New York City in the 1970s. It focuses on Richie Finestra, American Century Records founder and president, whose passion for music and discovering talent has gone by the wayside. With his American Century Records on the verge of being sold, a life-altering event rekindles Finestra's professional fire, but it may leave his personal life in ruins. In the episode, Richie and Devon go on a double date with Hannibal, while Kip is forced to fire a band member in order to secure a gig.

According to Nielsen Media Research, the episode was seen by an estimated 0.618 million household viewers and gained a 0.21 ratings share among adults aged 18–49. The episode received mixed reviews from critics, who criticized the writing, characters and pacing.

== Plot ==
Julie (Max Casella) fires Clark (Jack Quaid) after he fails to find a new act for American Century. Jack bursts into tears and pleas to keep his job. Taking a pity on him, Julie decides to give him a new position as assistant in the A&R department, replacing Jamie (Juno Temple).

Vince (David Proval) provides the police with an alibi for Richie (Bobby Cannavale), clearing him of any suspicion. This motivates him to name his sub-label as Alibi Records. Richie also meets with Kip (James Jagger), telling him he got the Nasty Bits to open for the New York Dolls at the Academy of Music, but Kip must fire one of his guitarists. Realizing that Hannibal (Daniel J. Watts) is considering signing with Koronet Records, Richie decides to take Hannibal on a double date with him, Devon (Olivia Wilde) and Richie's secretary, Cece (Susan Heyward). Richie also meets with Andrea "Andi" Zito (Annie Parisse), a former employee and flame who now works for Jervis (Ken Marino), failing to convince her in joining him.

Unable to fire his guitarist, Kip asks Lester (Ato Essandoh) to do it instead. He feels devastated as he feels a bit lost without the guitarist, but Jamie consoles him. The double date turns awkward as Hannibal ignores Cece and flirts with Devon instead, with Devon flirting back in order to help Richie. After leaving Hannibal and Cece at a hotel room, Richie and Devon make out at an elevator. However, Richie gets angry upon discovering that Devon was more interested in Hannibal than Richie. When he claims she planned to sleep with Hannibal, she slaps him and leaves him.

After finding that Hannibal chose to sign with Koronet Records, Richie goes to a Velvet Underground concert. He meets with Andie, trying to get her to come back as his world is falling. Andie refuses as Richie was never honest with her, prompting Richie to admit that he chose Devon over her because she was more beautiful and because she was reminiscent of himself. While hurt, she agrees to join if she gets a major share in his company, which he agrees.

== Production ==
=== Development ===
In March 2016, HBO announced that the fifth episode of the series would be titled "He in Racist Fire", and that it would be written by Adam Rapp and directed by Peter Sollett. This was Rapp's second writing credit, and Sollett's first directing credit.

== Reception ==
=== Viewers ===
In its original American broadcast, "He in Racist Fire" was seen by an estimated 0.618 million household viewers with a 0.21 in the 18–49 demographics. This means that 0.21 percent of all households with televisions watched the episode. This was a 7% increase in viewership from the previous episode, which was watched by 0.577 million household viewers with a 0.21 in the 18-49 demographics.

=== Critical reviews ===
"He in Racist Fire" received mixed reviews from critics. Matt Fowler of IGN gave the episode a "good" 7.4 out of 10 and wrote in his verdict, "'He in Racist Fire' worked to splinter Richie and Devon even more while also costing the label one of its biggest artists. All while The Nasty Bits' frontman made some hard "sellout" style choices about reconfiguring the band. The acting's always great and there're always a handful of great scenes on Vinyl, but a lot of it still relies on shock and bluster. To a numbing degree."

Dan Caffrey of The A.V. Club gave the episode a "C+" grade and wrote, "Alright, so Richie's unlikable. Fine. So are many of the other male protagonists I've mentioned. But what makes him unique? His respect for his family and peers is now either disingenuous or completely destroyed, so what defines him beyond his increasingly despicable behavior? I'm not sure Vinyl has the answer at this point. Right now, the series feels like it's being set up to be a redundantly cautionary tale, with Richie bound to take a harder fall than he's already taken."

Leah Greenblatt of Entertainment Weekly wrote, "We've been waiting half a season now to find out what kind of musical deus ex machina will swoop in to save Richie Finestra and American Century from bankruptcy (or worse, irrelevance). Will it be sneery punks the Nasty Bits? Richie's old friend and first signing, Lester? Some still-undiscovered genius? Who knows, but I'm not betting my mead chalice or my money on Wizard Fist." Noel Murray of Vulture gave the episode a 2 star rating out of 5 and wrote, "As soon as the writers figure out that these women can be witty, compassionate, creative, independent, and even joyous, they may just unlock Vinyl as a whole. There are so many other notes these talented actors and actresses could be playing besides 'angry.' For now, not only is 'He in Racist Fire' the series' worst installment yet, but at times it's so repugnant that it's hard to imagine the season ever rebounding."

Gavin Edwards of The New York Times wrote, "After watching half a season of Vinyl, it's time to ask: Where's this show headed? Although HBO has already renewed the series for a second season, it's more inconsistent than George Harrison's solo career. On the upside, it's got energy, lavish production values, and a talented cast playing a colorful collection of music-business misfits. But underneath that shiny surface, it doesn't have much to say — either about 1973 or about 2016. After the pilot, directed by Martin Scorsese, set off its fireworks, the show has settled into a predictable weekly groove where Richie Finestra careens around making a mess and everyone around him tries to pick up the pieces." Dan Martin of The Guardian wrote, "At its best, Vinyl is more lovably trashy than most HBO fare. It's a high-end soap; Dallas with better production values, so everybody needs to be doing the nasty with somebody. That's why most of the jerks at American Century are so hard to relate to. We'll be seeing more of Andrea – hopefully to bully Jamie, CeCe and Heather into putting a bit more purchase into overthrowing those morons."

Tony Sokol of Den of Geek gave the episode a 4 star rating out of 5 and wrote, "Richie Finestra might be the most self-destructive character on TV right now. I've been waiting for HBO to find a show worthy of a true Manson Lamps character and here we have the original, David Proval, as Richie's father. A man who's [sic] drinking got him kicked out of a prime seat in Artie Shaw's band. The jazz musician is obviously enjoying all the pain and suffering at American Century Records. But it wasn't as much fun as the bootleg tape that the cops were listening to in between bumps." Robert Ham of Paste wrote, "We get a taste of the post-Transformer Lou Reed experience via a decently-mimed performance of 'White Light/White Heat,' and an interesting look at the compromises that bands sometimes make to succeed, with the Nasty Bitz's leader agreeing to kick his friend and lead guitarist out of the fold. Surrounding that? Plenty of unhinged stupidity, mealy-mouthed dialogue, and all kinds of ridiculousness."
