= The King and I (Vinyl) =

- Vinyl episode
- Episode no.: Episode 7
- Directed by: Allen Coulter
- Written by: David Matthews
- Cinematography by: David Franco
- Editing by: Kate Sanford
- Original release date: March 27, 2016
- Running time: 57 minutes

Guest appearances
- Lena Olin as Mrs. Fineman; Shawn Klush as Elvis Presley; Gene Jones as Colonel Tom Parker; Annie Parisse as Andrea "Andie" Zito; John Ventimiglia as Lou Meshejian; Bo Dietl as Joe Corso; Armen Garo as Corrado Galasso; Jason Cottle as Detective Whorisky; Susan Heyward as Cece; Emily Tremaine as Heather; Ephraim Sykes as Marvin; MacKenzie Meehan as Penny; Griffin Newman as Casper; Frances Eve as Patty; Kati Sharp as Vivian

Episode chronology
← Previous "Cyclone"	Next → "E.A.B."

"The King and I" is the seventh episode of the American period drama television series Vinyl. The episode was written by David Matthews and directed by Allen Coulter. It originally aired on HBO on March 27, 2016.

The series is set in New York City in the 1970s. It focuses on Richie Finestra, American Century Records founder and president, whose passion for music and discovering talent has gone by the wayside. With his American Century Records on the verge of being sold, a life-altering event rekindles Finestra's professional fire, but it may leave his personal life in ruins. In the episode, Richie and Zak travel to Los Angeles to sell the company jet, before heading for Las Vegas to sign Elvis Presley.

According to Nielsen Media Research, the episode was seen by an estimated 0.666 million household viewers and gained a 0.22 ratings share among adults aged 18–49. The episode received generally positive reviews from critics, praising the focus on the Vegas storyline and performances, but criticizing Richie's characterization.

== Plot ==
A sober Richie (Bobby Cannavale) travels to Los Angeles to sell the company jet to another executive, accompanied by Zak (Ray Romano). After completing the sale, the executive, Lou Meshejian (John Ventimiglia), invites them to a party at his beach house.

Jamie (Juno Temple) is informed by her mother, Mrs. Fineman (Lena Olin), that she will get evicted from her building unless she gets a new profession. At a restaurant, Joe Corso (Bo Dietl) salutes Corrado (Armen Garo) by his gangster position, embarrassing him in front of the patrons. Unaware to them, this is overheard by Detective Whorisky (Jason Cottle).

At the party, Richie and Zak discover that Elvis Presley (Shawn Klush) plans to leave RCA Victor following a gig in Las Vegas. They decide to visit Las Vega to try to get Presley to sign with American Century. They meet with Colonel Tom Parker (Gene Jones), who gives them tickets to a performance. However, Zak is unimpressed with Presley and both decide to leave. Noticing the number "18" in many places, Richie retreats to a casino, where he uses the number in many games, winning multiple times. While Zak pushes him to continue betting, Richie decides to leave after winning $5,000.

Richie meets with Presley at his suite, almost convincing him in signing. However, Parker interrupts the meeting and manipulates Presley in attacking Richie, before ordering him to leave the suite. The following morning, Richie finds that Zak slept with two women, but the women ended up robbing them the $90,000 from the jet sale. While angry with Zak, Richie forgives him and they return to New York. However, it is revealed that the money was actually gambled by Richie after listening "18 Yellow Roses", only to lose it at a roulette. On the airplane back to New York, Richie once again sees the "18" number.

== Production ==
=== Development ===
In March 2016, HBO announced that the seventh episode of the series would be titled "The King and I", and that it would be written by David Matthews, and directed by Allen Coulter. This was Matthews' first writing credit, and Coulter's second directing credit.

== Reception ==
=== Viewers ===
In its original American broadcast, "The King and I" was seen by an estimated 0.666 million household viewers with a 0.22 in the 18–49 demographics. This means that 0.22 percent of all households with televisions watched the episode. This was a 16% increase in viewership from the previous episode, which was watched by 0.570 million household viewers with a 0.21 in the 18-49 demographics.

=== Critical reviews ===
"The King and I" received generally positive reviews from critics. Matt Fowler of IGN gave the episode a "great" 8 out of 10 and wrote in his verdict, "'The King and I' managed to avoid some of the usual Vinyl pitfalls by giving the spotlight over to Richie and Zak so that one basic story could be told, and told well. It also helped that, at least for one episode, we got a clear-headed (relatively speaking) Richie who wasn't out to raise hell or drown himself in drugs. This cleared the path for some differently-styled drama and a fun scene with Elvis."

Dan Caffrey of The A.V. Club gave the episode a "B–" grade and wrote, "After the credits are phased out by the static and heavenly chords of the Home Box Office logo, Terence Winter refers to 'The King And I' as 'Richie's experiment with sobriety' in the post-show interview. Maybe it's unfair to read so far into Winter's words, but I can't help but think it's just more proof that he and the writers of Vinyl are aggressively trying to make their protagonist as horrible as possible. I can't help but think it proves that the only reason 'The King And I' functions as a redemption song for so much of its runtime is so Richie can backslide into shittiness at the very end."

Leah Greenblatt of Entertainment Weekly wrote, "So he's the one who lost it all, and 'going to go ahead and let Zak kill himself with guilt about it anyway. In other words, he's still as Richie as he's ever been. And now he's downing Smirnoff on the airplane like it's a magic roofie that will let him forget. All it does, though, is leave a wet spot on his Maslow in the shape of — yep, a 1 and an 8." Noel Murray of Vulture gave the episode a 3 star rating out of 5 and wrote, "Still, after two straight weeks of Vinyl repeating the same flat, shrill notes, it's reinvigorating to see a plot with an arc that actually goes places."

Gavin Edwards of The New York Times wrote, "This episode suggests that Vinyl is at its best when it's unencumbered by Richie's substance abuse and domestic drama — and when it doesn't take itself too seriously." Dan Martin of The Guardian wrote, "This week's life lesson? We're all just one disastrous business meeting with Elvis Presley away from sinking to new depths of moral depravity. Bizarrely, this is the situation in which Vinyl finds itself: the dafter things get, the more likeable they become."

Tony Sokol of Den of Geek gave the episode a 4 star rating out of 5 and wrote, "Richie Finestra would have found them a perfect fit for Alibi Records. He is a punk. He will head bang before the series ends. So let it be written, so let it be done, as Andrea Zito might say." Robert Ham of Paste wrote, "For most TV series, it usually takes a few seasons before they toss in a jump to another setting in hopes of catching viewers off-guard and drumming up some inspiration in the writers' room. With Vinyl, it only took them seven episodes to truck Richie and Zak off to L.A. and Vegas in hopes of regaining their lustre. It's a tired, tired trope. Almost as tiresome as the parade of familiar names and signposts that the writers weave into each storyline just so we know that, hey man, they get it."
