= The Racket (Vinyl) =

- Vinyl episode
- Episode no.: Episode 4
- Directed by: S. J. Clarkson
- Written by: Debora Cahn
- Cinematography by: Reed Morano
- Editing by: Tim Streeto
- Original release date: March 6, 2016
- Running time: 54 minutes

Guest appearances
- Ken Marino as Jackie Jervis; Daniel J. Watts as Hannibal; Annie Parisse as Andrea "Andie" Zito; David Proval as Vince Finestra; Michael Drayer as Detective Renk; Jason Cottle as Detective Whorisky; Susan Heyward as Cece; Emily Tremaine as Heather; Ephraim Sykes as Marvin; MacKenzie Meehan as Penny; Griffin Newman as Casper; Jay Klaitz as Hal Underwood

Episode chronology
| ← Previous "Whispered Secrets" | Next → "He in Racist Fire" |

"The Racket" is the fourth episode of the American period drama television series Vinyl. The episode was written by Debora Cahn and directed by S. J. Clarkson. It originally aired on HBO on March 6, 2016.

The series is set in New York City in the 1970s. It focuses on Richie Finestra, American Century Records founder and president, whose passion for music and discovering talent has gone by the wayside. With his American Century Records on the verge of being sold, a life-altering event rekindles Finestra's professional fire, but it may leave his personal life in ruins. In the episode, Richie tries to secure a funk superstar, while Devon questions her marriage.

According to Nielsen Media Research, the episode was seen by an estimated 0.577 million household viewers and gained a 0.21 ratings share among adults aged 18–49. The episode received generally positive reviews from critics, with praise aimed at the episode's humor and character development.

== Plot ==
While his associates attend Buck Rogers' funeral, Richie (Bobby Cannavale) attends a marriage-counseling session with Devon (Olivia Wilde), in which he takes his anger out by hitting a sofa with a tennis racket. He also informs Zak (Ray Romano) that they need to secure funk star Hannibal (Daniel J. Watts) for the company and warns him in leaving him alone.

After Hannibal has a meeting with Richie, the latter is visited by Robert Goulet (Matt Bogart), who wants to record an original song on his upcoming Christmas LP, which Richie allows. Richie is also approached by Lester (Ato Essandoh), who shows up his disdain for his proposal by burning his old demos. Richie is later shocked when Kip (James Jagger) announces that Nasty Bits have found their new manager, Lester himself.

Devon meets with a divorce lawyer, providing photographs of Richie's behavior causing destruction at their house. Despite his actions, she intends to share custody of the children, as Richie never abused her nor the children. The lawyer then dismisses her, as Devon is not planning in fully divorcing him, also scolding her for living with someone like Richie.

During a performance, Jackie Jervis (Ken Marino) tries to get Hannibal to sign for Koronet Records. Richie tries to get there and stop it, but is stopped when two detectives show up. The detectives want to know his connection to Buck, as he was the last person he called. He later leaves the apartment, ignoring an angry Devon about her meeting with the divorce lawyer. He arrives at a jazz club to meet with a trumpet player (David Proval). The trumpet player is revealed to be his father Vince, with Richie saying he needs an alibi.

== Production ==
=== Development ===
In March 2016, HBO announced that the fourth episode of the series would be titled "The Racket", and that it would be written by Debora Cahn and directed by S. J. Clarkson. This was Cahn's second writing credit, and Clarkson's first directing credit.

== Reception ==
=== Viewers ===
In its original American broadcast, "The Racket" was seen by an estimated 0.577 million household viewers with a 0.21 in the 18–49 demographics. This means that 0.21 percent of all households with televisions watched the episode. This was a 8% increase in viewership from the previous episode, which was watched by 0.533 million household viewers with a 0.20 in the 18-49 demographics.

=== Critical reviews ===
"The Racket" received generally positive reviews from critics. Matt Fowler of IGN gave the episode a "good" 7.8 out of 10 and wrote in his verdict, "'The Racket' used more humor than usual to lean into its darker themes while also - you know - sticking it to Richie a little bit. It's much easier to accept him as a cad and a villain than as a protagonist and so when Lester turned the tables on him, it felt really good. The side story stuff involving Skip and the Donny Osmond records, and some of Zak's issues, seemed to fill up belt space, but the idea of one chaotic day at the office was good."

Dan Caffrey of The A.V. Club gave the episode a "B+" grade and wrote, "Unlike previous episodes, director S.J. Clarkson skirts any kind of self-important message in favor of a panicked tone, flirting with several different musical styles and keeping the camerawork loose as she pogos from story to story."

Leah Greenblatt of Entertainment Weekly wrote, "Dad seems like kind of a dick in the brief moments we get to meet him. But Richie needs a favor — more specifically, an alibi for the night of Buck’s murder. Will he get it? Only grumpy Pops Finestra and next Sunday's episode know for sure." Noel Murray of Vulture gave the episode a 4 star rating out of 5 and wrote, "Tonally, the Devon material is still out of synch with the rest of this show. It¿s consistently dour where the rest of the Vinyl is fairly lively. Thematically, however, her story line¿s been on-point. [...] Vinyl is a drama about passion, art, and culture in transition. What we've been learning each week is that, in the case of all three, everything's negotiable."

Gavin Edwards of The New York Times wrote, "In the real world of 1973, female musicians were outnumbered by their male counterparts — but they have it even harder on Vinyl. While the show has featured some fleeting impressions of distaff singers to liven up the soundtrack, the action is focused on manly men singing manly songs." Dan Martin of The Guardian wrote, "Finally, Vinyl delivers an episode that lives up to the promise of its premise. You suspect the writers had their Damascene moment after realising the Alice Cooper strand last week was the strongest thing about the series so far. If you're going to make a show about something as fundamentally hilarious as the business of rock’n’roll, you better make sure it's funny. And episode four, 'The Racket', is very funny."

Tony Sokol of Den of Geek gave the episode a 4 star rating out of 5 and wrote, "So the title works on three levels: The noise that the punk band is making; the bent-nosed goons making the scene behind the scenes and that fucking tennis racket. That's a lot of sonic pollution to smother Richie's head. It's a wonder he can think as straight as he does when he’s straight. His musical decisions are better when he's at least slightly curved." Robert Ham of Paste wrote, "For as much as their awful wigs and even worse facial hair terrifies me every week, I'm starting to think I'd prefer to follow the careers of all the characters that aren't Richie Finestra in Vinyl. I'm four episodes into this series, and I've already checked out on the main storylines involving the drug-addled head of American Century Records, his frustrated wife, and his involvement in the head crushing of a crazed radio impresario. That's supposed to be the exciting stuff. Instead, I just want to hang in the limo with the promotions guy, the sales guru, and the A&R head as they pass around insults like a fat spliff."
