= E.A.B. =

- Vinyl episode
- Episode no.: Episode 8
- Directed by: Jon S. Baird
- Written by: Riccardo DiLoreto; Michael Mitnick
- Cinematography by: Reed Morano
- Editing by: Tim Streeto; Perri B. Frank
- Original release date: April 3, 2016
- Running time: 57 minutes

Guest appearances
- Annie Parisse as Andrea "Andie" Zito; Douglas Smith as Gary / Xavier; Bo Dietl as Joe Corso; Armen Garo as Corrado Galasso; Michael Kostroff as Allen Charnitski; Richard Short as Billy McVicar; Michael Drayer as Detective Renk; Jason Cottle as Detective Whorisky; Susan Heyward as Cece; Emily Tremaine as Heather; Ephraim Sykes as Marvin; MacKenzie Meehan as Penny; Griffin Newman as Casper; Jay Klaitz as Hal Underwood

Episode chronology
← Previous "The King and I"	Next → "Rock and Roll Queen"

"E.A.B." is the eighth episode of the American period drama television series Vinyl. The episode was written by Riccardo DiLoreto and Michael Mitnick and directed by Jon S. Baird. It originally aired on HBO on April 3, 2016.

The series is set in New York City in the 1970s. It focuses on Richie Finestra, American Century Records founder and president, whose passion for music and discovering talent has gone by the wayside. With his American Century Records on the verge of being sold, a life-altering event rekindles Finestra's professional fire, but it may leave his personal life in ruins. In the episode, Richie faces severe problems within American Century, while Kip is pressured to get a new song.

According to Nielsen Media Research, the episode was seen by an estimated 0.567 million household viewers and gained a 0.20 ratings share among adults aged 18–49. The episode received positive reviews from critics, praising the segments involving Lester and Kip, as well as the performances.

== Plot ==
Richie (Bobby Cannavale), Zak (Ray Romano) and Skip (J. C. MacKenzie) visit a loan officer at Chemical Bank with high school ties with Zak, hoping to get a loan. However, the officer declines their request, feeling the investment is not worthy. At American Century, Hal Underwood (Jay Klaitz) is fired by Andie (Annie Parisse) after he makes a disparaging comment of her.

Joe Corso (Bo Dietl) visits Richie, telling him that the police is re-opening Buck Rogers' case and that they will investigate them as they were on his house that night. Richie also has to deal with Zak's erratic search for new talent, as he still feels guilty over the events at Las Vegas. Desperate to get rid of his problems, Richie asks Maury (Paul Ben-Victor) to make a deal with Galasso (Armen Garo) for a loan, but Maury warns him that Richie will get himself killed if he fails to respect the terms of his deal. Galasso agrees to the loan, but forces Richie to share office space with Maury's label.

The Nasty Bits are scolded by Richie for not improving on their sound, demanding that they get a new song to play before opening for the New York Dolls. When Kip (James Jagger) is unable to come up with anything, Lester (Ato Essandoh) helps them by playing the E.A.B. chord progression, making the band see how many artists used it for popular songs. This motivates Kip and his band to finally move forward with a new song, which impresses the crowd.

Devon (Olivia Wilde) and Ingrid (Birgitte Hjort Sørensen) visit Max's Kansas City, noticing photographer Billy McVicar (Richard Short). When Billy is unable to get John Lennon on a photograph, Devon impresses him by asking Lennon to take a picture of her and Ingrid, which gets him to accept a photograph. Devon helps Billy in developing the photographs at a darkroom. While working at the mailroom, Clark (Jack Quaid) talks with an old rival, Jorge (Christian Navarro). Jorge confesses that he often steals company CDs for benefits in dance clubs, which impresses Clark.

After being forced to accept to Galasso's terms, Richie is detained by the detectives, who take him to the station for further questioning. Richie refuses to speak without a lawyer, also refusing to implicate Corso into the matter. However, the detectives reveal that Richie's office was bugged, and they have him arrested.

== Production ==
=== Development ===
In March 2016, HBO announced that the eighth episode of the series would be titled "E.A.B.", and that it would be written by Riccardo DiLoreto and Michael Mitnick, and directed by Jon S. Baird. This was DiLoreto's first writing credit, Mitnick's first writing credit, and Baird's first directing credit.

== Reception ==
=== Viewers ===
In its original American broadcast, "E.A.B." was seen by an estimated 0.567 million household viewers with a 0.20 in the 18–49 demographics. This means that 0.20 percent of all households with televisions watched the episode. This was a 15% decrease in viewership from the previous episode, which was watched by 0.666 million household viewers with a 0.22 in the 18-49 demographics.

=== Critical reviews ===
"E.A.B." received positive reviews from critics. Matt Fowler of IGN gave the episode a "great" 8 out of 10 and wrote in his verdict, "'E.A.B.' used just about everyone on the show's roster, and used them well. After a couple of episodes that really dug into certain specific characters, the show is now able to more fully realize its ensemble nature. The best part here, this week, being Lester's musical tutelage of Kip, and then the blending of both their sounds."

Dan Caffrey of The A.V. Club gave the episode a "B+" grade and wrote, "At the risk of simplifying the series' strengths, I'm going to call it: Tonight's episode of Vinyl works because it focuses on making music — the writing of it, the distribution of it, the marketing of it, all of it. Almost every conflict and character motivation stems from the business of creating art, and when Vinyl sticks to being about business, Vinyl is good."

Leah Greenblatt of Entertainment Weekly wrote, "Clark is getting his mind blown by the underground, and possibly discovering some new talent that could save American Century, but otherwise this feels like a strangely anticlimactic ending for a season with only two episodes to go." Noel Murray of Vulture gave the episode a 4 star rating out of 5 and wrote, "This week's 'E.A.B.' is more than halfway decent. It's the best Vinyl since this season's promising third and fourth episodes — both of which succeeded by being stylish, funny, eventful, and relatively unpretentious. Here again, Vinyl backs down from trying to be the Very Important Saga of Richie Finestra, Troubled Genius, and instead weaves together several low-stakes stories with top-shelf material."

Gavin Edwards of The New York Times wrote, "Vinyl has featured lots of rock history lessons, but none as good as the moment when Lester decides to strap on a guitar and give the Nasty Bits a succinct history of the E-A-B chord progression." Dan Martin of The Guardian wrote, "Despite everything, you might feel sorry for Richie after Joe Corso fitted him up for Buck's murder. But his antics in Vegas last week, gambling the rest of the company's money away and letting Zak think it was his fault, have rendered the guy pretty much irredeemable by this point. By contrast, another solid and enjoyable episode finds things coming together for everyone else."

Tony Sokol of Den of Geek gave the episode a 3.5 star rating out of 5 and wrote, "'E.A.B.' was an active movement in the series. While the American Century Records staff are finding their way forward, Richie is folding up in the middle." Robert Ham of Paste wrote, "What better way to pad out your shows with talent, than to contractually obligate your actors to do it. That is certainly helping a show like Vinyl, as these folks provide a little bit of grounding for the scenery chewing that is going on around them from week to week. Those fine character actors mentioned above may be wasting their time with this overwrought drama, but at least they're getting paid while they do it."
