= Rock and Roll Queen (Vinyl) =

- Vinyl episode
- Episode no.: Episode 9
- Directed by: Carl Franklin
- Written by: Debora Cahn
- Cinematography by: David Franco
- Editing by: Kate Sanford; Eric Lorenz
- Original release date: April 10, 2016
- Running time: 54 minutes

Guest appearances
- Annie Parisse as Andrea "Andie" Zito; Bo Dietl as Joe Corso; Richard Short as Billy McVicar; Jim Bracchitta as Harlan Reed; Michael Drayer as Detective Renk; Jason Cottle as Detective Whorisky; Susan Heyward as Cece; Emily Tremaine as Heather; Ephraim Sykes as Marvin; MacKenzie Meehan as Penny; Griffin Newman as Casper

Episode chronology
← Previous "E.A.B."	Next → "Alibi"

"Rock and Roll Queen" is the ninth episode of the American period drama television series Vinyl. The episode was written by Debora Cahn and directed by Carl Franklin. It originally aired on HBO on April 10, 2016.

The series is set in New York City in the 1970s. It focuses on Richie Finestra, American Century Records founder and president, whose passion for music and discovering talent has gone by the wayside. With his American Century Records on the verge of being sold, a life-altering event rekindles Finestra's professional fire, but it may leave his personal life in ruins. In the episode, Richie is pressured by the police in taking a deal, while Jamie is evicted from her house.

According to Nielsen Media Research, the episode was seen by an estimated 0.753 million household viewers and gained a 0.24 ratings share among adults aged 18–49. The episode received positive reviews from critics, with critics praising Richie's new character development and focused narrative.

== Plot ==
Richie (Bobby Cannavale) is released from jail with his lawyer's help, but the detectives state that Richie could be heading to trial for Buck Rogers' murder. They offer him a chance to avoid a lengthy sentence by incriminating Galasso (Armen Garo) and plead guilty to another charge.

Maury Gold (Paul Ben-Victor) attends a meeting with American Century, where he pitches a 50s compilation LP, unimpressing the executives, while Zak (Ray Romano) states he plans to sign Gary (Douglas Smith) as a new talent. When Andi (Annie Parisse) says she intends to get Hannibal back at AC, Cece (Susan Heyward) storms off crying. Andi then discovers that Cece is pregnant with Hannibal's child and scolds her. Lester (Ato Essandoh) drops by the conference room and angrily leaves upon seeing Maury.

Jamie (Juno Temple) is evicted from her townhouse by her aunt, and she decides to move in with Kip (James Jagger). She helps him in arranging a photoshoot for Nasty Bits, although she is not convinced of the photographer's idea for their album cover. She manages to change the style, as well as flirting with Kip's bandmate, Alex. Back at the apartment, Jamie, Kip and Alex have a threesome.

Richie visits Devon (Olivia Wilde) at the Chelsea Hotel, finding that she is now in a relationship with Billy McVicar (Richard Short). Richie asks to see their kids, which Devon allows with the presence of Ingrid (Birgitte Hjort Sørensen). He then goes back to the office, where Zak punches Richie for lying about the events at Las Vegas; he received a phone call from the casino hotel, where he found that the money was gambled at their table, realizing Richie actually gave away their money. Richie later meets with Devon, confessing that he killed Buck Rogers when he attacked him, shocking her. He then calls his lawyer, Harlan Reed (Jim Bracchitta), intending to help in taking Galasso down.

== Production ==
=== Development ===
In March 2016, HBO announced that the ninth episode of the series would be titled "Rock and Roll Queen", and that it would be written by Debora Cahn, and directed by Carl Franklin. This was Cahn's third writing credit, and Franklin's first directing credit.

== Reception ==
=== Viewers ===
In its original American broadcast, "Rock and Roll Queen" was seen by an estimated 0.753 million household viewers with a 0.24 in the 18–49 demographics. This means that 0.24 percent of all households with televisions watched the episode. This was a 32% increase in viewership from the previous episode, which was watched by 0.567 million household viewers with a 0.20 in the 18-49 demographics.

=== Critical reviews ===
"Rock and Roll Queen" received generally positive reviews from critics. Matt Fowler of IGN gave the episode a "good" 7.6 out of 10 and wrote in his verdict, "Richie's crazed guilty feelings over Buck Rogers, and close calls with the cops, have never been my favorite part of Vinyl. Naturally though, it's what we're focusing on as we head into the season finale. The actual crime elements of the show. That's not to say that the music, and the attempt to launch a sub-label, have been short-sheeted, but this episode ended with a large focus on the mob/murder pieces."

Dan Caffrey of The A.V. Club gave the episode a "B+" grade and wrote, "When Zak beats the shit out of Richie in an elevator at the end of 'Rock And Roll Queen,' he may as well be a stand-in for the audience. For almost an entire season, we've watched Richie lie, cheat, steal, and kill in a way that, in TV Land, hasn't made him a unique asshole as much as just a plain old asshole. Is there anyone watching at this point who doesn't want to throw a few good punches at him?"

Leah Greenblatt of Entertainment Weekly wrote, "Lie down with dogs, wake up with roaches. After a sleepless, vermin-infested weekend in lockup, Richie is finally released, but he looks rougher than he has coming off the most epic my-dead-German-friend-is-alive bender. Now he's looking at a laundry list of charges: manslaughter, obstruction of justice, aiding and abetting, destruction of evidence." Noel Murray of Vulture gave the episode a 3 star rating out of 5 and wrote, "Once again, Vinyl is all the better for focusing on the business side of Richie's life. This episode is a step down from last week's 'E.A.B.,' though. It's more blatantly a piece-mover, setting the stage for next week's season finale. [...] That's all necessary plot advancement, but it's made more interesting for where it may lead next week than for how it's played out onscreen in 'Rock and Roll Queen.' With a couple of exceptions, that is. It was pretty satisfying to see Zak finally beat the crap out of Richie. It's also nice to see a Vinyl episode that finally focuses on female characters without making them arbitrarily awful."

Gavin Edwards of The New York Times wrote, "Vinyl is gaining confidence in its storytelling as the series progresses. While the show still has plenty of over-the-top moments where it tries to funnel emotions through a Marshall stack, it now lets many of its scenes, like the silent staring contest between Richie and Billy, play on a human scale." Dan Martin of The Guardian wrote, "This penultimate hour proved another case in point. Events come home to roost, and the show is pulled in as many different directions as Richie Finestra. The murder rap turns out to be a red herring. The police are using what they know about Buck's death to make Richie rat on Galasso – which is a death sentence anyway. So without much resolution, Richie's back to work, and a sequence of unrelated events bring about some kind of event horizon."

Tony Sokol of Den of Geek gave the episode a 4 star rating out of 5 and wrote, "At heart Richie is a record guy, and record guys make deals. The deals they make usually work out for them much better than they do for the artist, so I'm sure the Alibi records president figures he can recoup his losses in the fine print. If not, he just might be dumped into the East River along with all the other cut-out records." Robert Ham of Paste wrote, "I'd like to imagine that the roach we see crawling around the jail cell at the beginning of this week's episode of Vinyl is something like the rat that pops up at the very end of The Departed: a not-so-subtle reminder that we're in the company of some pretty despicable people. Alas, I think this show reveres these knotheads just a little too much. Particularly the ones that are making the songs that made you cry and the songs that saved your life. Even if that song is some silly disco pastiche that clears a dancefloor."
