= Cyclone (Vinyl) =

- Vinyl episode
- Episode no.: Episode 6
- Directed by: Nicole Kassell
- Written by: Carl Capotorto; Erin Cressida Wilson
- Cinematography by: Reed Morano
- Editing by: Tim Streeto
- Original release date: March 20, 2016
- Running time: 54 minutes

Guest appearances
- John Cameron Mitchell as Andy Warhol; Annie Parisse as Andrea "Andie" Zito; Carrington Vilmont as Ernst; Noah Bean as David Bowie; Armando Riesco as Paul Bezak; Douglas Smith as Gary / Xavier; Susan Heyward as Cece; Emily Tremaine as Heather; MacKenzie Meehan as Penny; Griffin Newman as Casper; Jay Klaitz as Hal Underwood

Episode chronology
← Previous "He in Racist Fire"	Next → "The King and I"

"Cyclone" is the sixth episode of the American period drama television series Vinyl. The episode was written by Carl Capotorto and Erin Cressida Wilson and directed by Nicole Kassell. It originally aired on HBO on March 20, 2016.

The series is set in New York City in the 1970s. It focuses on Richie Finestra, American Century Records founder and president, whose passion for music and discovering talent has gone by the wayside. With his American Century Records on the verge of being sold, a life-altering event rekindles Finestra's professional fire, but it may leave his personal life in ruins. In the episode, Richie desperately tries to find Devon, with the help of an old friend.

According to Nielsen Media Research, the episode was seen by an estimated 0.570 million household viewers and gained a 0.21 ratings share among adults aged 18–49. The episode received generally positive reviews from critics, with praise towards the performances and tone, but criticism for Richie's character. Many also expressed disdain for the episode's twist, with some feeling it was predictable and a weak narrative choice.

== Plot ==
Richie (Bobby Cannavale) is worried about Devon (Olivia Wilde), as she has lost all contact with him. His old friend, Ernst (Carrington Vilmont), suggests he should abandon his marriage and have sex with anyone. Devon is revealed to have gone to the Chelsea Hotel, staying with Ingrid (Birgitte Hjort Sørensen), an old friend from her Warhol days.

Andie (Annie Parisse) has started working at American Century, surprising Zak (Ray Romano). Ray also threatens Kip (James Jagger) in selecting his new guitarist, warning him he could drop him if he does not comply. When Ernst claims to have found where Devon is, Richie goes to Max's Kansas City. He runs into Warhol (John Cameron Mitchell) and attacks him when he suspects he is hiding Devon. Richie and Ernst then escape and hide in a car in the suburbs.

The following morning, Richie wakes and hurriedly attends Zak's daughter's bat mitzvah, only to arrive at the end of the ceremony. Fed up with his behavior, Zak punches him, calling him out for his behavior and ruining his family. Richie then returns home, finding Devon already there. Richie promises to be a better person and stop using drugs, but Devon gets angry when he mentions he was talking to Ernst. As Richie takes a shower, Devon decides to leave the house with their children. Ernst promises to help Richie in finding her again, but Richie eventually realizes that Ernst is not real. In a flashback, it is revealed that Richie was recklessly driving a car with Devon, Ingrid and Ernst, Ingrid's boyfriend, on their way to the Coney Island Cyclone. The car gets into a car crash, killing Ernst and causing a pregnant Devon to miscarry.

== Production ==
=== Development ===
In March 2016, HBO announced that the sixth episode of the series would be titled "Cyclone", and that it would be written by Carl Capotorto and Erin Cressida Wilson, and directed by Nicole Kassell. This was Capotorto's first writing credit, Wilson's first writing credit, and Kassell's first directing credit.

== Reception ==
=== Viewers ===
In its original American broadcast, "Cyclone" was seen by an estimated 0.570 million household viewers with a 0.21 in the 18–49 demographics. This means that 0.21 percent of all households with televisions watched the episode. This was a 8% decrease in viewership from the previous episode, which was watched by 0.618 million household viewers with a 0.21 in the 18-49 demographics.

=== Critical reviews ===
"Cyclone" received generally positive reviews from critics. Matt Fowler of IGN gave the episode a "great" 8.2 out of 10 and wrote in his verdict, "'Cyclone' brought Richie down to (I'm assuming) the lowest he could get. Which was good. If you're going to go all the way, go all the way. Now comes the rebuilding process, hopefully, and less of the self-destructive pattern that's grown tiresome. And because this episode felt like the start of a turning point, it landed a lot better than previous entries."

Dan Caffrey of The A.V. Club gave the episode a "B–" grade and wrote, "Once writers Carl Capotorto and Erin Cressida Wilson add a traumatic car accident to the mix, the wild grimness becomes somehow more unbelievable than it already was. But even among the clichés; even among the deceitful ghost sidekick, Richie's stereotypically dark HBO protagonist, and Devon's oppressed artist-turned-housewife, 'Cyclone' at least has some alluring visuals and a glimpse of salvation that's far more interesting than any of the hedonism has been so far."

Leah Greenblatt of Entertainment Weekly wrote, "Poor Ernst, even deader than Buck Rogers — and poor Richie, who might finally be realizing just how deep this mess he's made has taken him down." Noel Murray of Vulture gave the episode a 3 star rating out of 5 and wrote, "Even at its most aggravating, Vinyl maintains a certain surface appeal, too polished to dismiss. To paraphrase 'Chelsea Hotel' and Leonard Cohen: It's ugly, but it has the music."

Gavin Edwards of The New York Times criticized the twist by writing, "any viewer who is surprised to discover that Ernst is actually a cocaine-induced hallucination was probably also shocked at the end of each episode of Scooby-Doo. The problem is not just that the plot twist is hackneyed, it's that it's hard to care about one more manifestation of Richie’s cocaine problem." Dan Martin of The Guardian wrote, "Vinyl's at its strongest when it makes the most of its setting, weaker when doing the generic anti-hero stuff and little else. This episode, 'Cyclone', made the most of both."

Tony Sokol of Den of Geek gave the episode a 3.5 star rating out of 5 and wrote, "The Cyclone is the scariest ride on Coney Island. It doesn't have the deepest dips or the most dangerous curves. What makes the Cyclone so scary is that it looks like it can fall apart at any moment. That's what Richie Finestra looks like in Vinyl's 'Cyclone' episode. This guy is falling apart." Robert Ham of Paste wrote, "I was cold on her storyline from the start, but I'm learning to really enjoy her journey of self-discovery and self-reliance, as she pushes away from her crazed home life and back into the art world that she left behind to raise a family. I'm also starting to appreciate the trials of the Nasty Bits, and the welcome thrill of the scene where Kip finds a new lead guitarist for the band. The rest of the episode? Not so great."
