= The World's Greatest Elvis =

2007 TV talent show

The World's Greatest Elvis was a September 2007 TV talent show hosted by Vernon Kay on BBC One. The programme presented thirty Elvis impersonators to battle it out for best Elvis Presley interpretation. The title was won by Shawn Klush from Pittston, Pennsylvania.

The three judges were Joe Esposito, Craig Revel Horwood and Suzi Quatro and the series was produced by Barrie Kelly and directed by Julian Smith.
