= Slow Machine =

- Film poster
- Directed by: Paul Felten; Joe Denardo
- Written by: Paul Felten
- Produced by: Kyle Hepp; Shrihari Sathe; Caroline Von Kuhn; Alex Witherill
- Starring: Stephanie Hayes; Chloë Sevigny; Scott Shepherd; Eleanor Friedberger; Ean Sheeny; Emily Tremaine
- Cinematography: Joe Denardo
- Edited by: Joe Denardo; Ian Olds
- Production companies: Green Street Films; ACE Productions; Dialectic
- Distributed by: Grasshopper Film
- Release dates: 23 January 2020 (Rotterdam); 4 June 2021 (United States)
- Running time: 72 minutes
- Country: United States
- Language: English

Slow Machine is a 2020 American thriller film, directed by Joe DeNardo and Paul Felten, from a screenplay by Felten. It stars Stephanie Hayes, Chloë Sevigny, Scott Shepherd, Eleanor Friedberger, Ean Sheeny and Emily Tremaine.

Slow Machine had its world premiere at the International Film Festival Rotterdam on January 23, 2020, and was theatrically released on June 4, 2021, by Grasshopper Film.

== Cast ==
- Stephanie Hayes as Stephanie
- Chloë Sevigny as Chloe
- Scott Shepherd as Gerard
- Eleanor Friedberger as Eleanor
- Ean Sheeny as Jim
- Emily Tremaine as The Relator

== Release ==
The film had its world premiere at the International Film Festival Rotterdam on January 23, 2020. The film also screened at the New York Film Festival on October 8, 2020. In October 2020, Grasshopper Film acquired distribution rights to the film and theatrically released Slow Machine on June 4, 2021.
