= These Hopeless Savages =

These Hopeless Savages is a 2014 feature film released by Working Group Pictures in March 2015. Before its theatrical release, the film played over 30 national and international film festivals, including the Twin Cities Film Fest, the Indianapolis International Film Festival, and the Orlando Film Festival. Kaitlyn Busbee and Sean Lewis directed the film. It also features an atmospherically pop soundtrack by Greg Samothrakis.

Based on an original screenplay by Sean Lewis and Matt Dellapina, the movie stars Matt Dellapina as Greg - a children's musician living in the cozy, domestic confines of Brooklyn. When big news comes in for his absentee friend, the constant bachelor Shawn (Sean Lewis), the two make it a mission to visit everyone who has shunned Shawn for years. After the two old friends stumble over some re-acquainting pains, they soon hit the American road.

The film also stars Maria Vorhis and star of HBO's Vinyl, MacKenzie Meehan.

Along its festival run and theatrical release, These Hopeless Savages enjoyed a warm critical response. Edward Johnson-Ott called the film, "a winning celebration of friendship as well as an unassuming study of the human condition." Michael Anthony Adams called These Hopeless Savages one of "the best of Indy Fest."
