= Vinyl (TV series) =

American period television drama

- Title card
- Genre: Period drama; Crime drama; Black comedy
- Created by: Mick Jagger; Martin Scorsese; Rich Cohen; Terence Winter
- Starring: Bobby Cannavale; Paul Ben-Victor; P. J. Byrne; Max Casella; Ato Essandoh; James Jagger; J. C. MacKenzie; Jack Quaid; Ray Romano; Birgitte Hjort Sørensen; Juno Temple; Olivia Wilde
- Opening theme: "Sugar Daddy" by Sturgill Simpson
- Country of origin: United States
- Original language: English
- No. of episodes: 10

Production
- Executive producers: Martin Scorsese; Mick Jagger; Terence Winter; Victoria Pearman; Rick Yorn; Emma Tillinger Koskoff; John Melfi; Allen Coulter; George Mastras; Scott Z. Burns; Max Borenstein
- Producers: Mari Jo Winkler-Ioffreda; Brad Carpenter; Jessica Levin; Erin Cressida Wilson; David Matthews
- Production locations: Steiner Studios, Brooklyn, New York; New York City, New York
- Cinematography: Rodrigo Prieto; Reed Morano; David Franco
- Editors: David Tedeschi; Tim Streeto; Kate Sanford
- Camera setup: Single-camera
- Running time: 53–60 minutes 113 minutes (pilot)
- Production companies: Paramount Television; Jagged Productions; Sikelia Productions; Cold Front Productions

Original release
- Network: HBO
- Release: February 14 – April 17, 2016

Vinyl is an American period drama television series created by Mick Jagger, Martin Scorsese, Rich Cohen and Terence Winter. The series stars Bobby Cannavale as Richie Finestra, a New York City-based record executive in 1973. It premiered on HBO on February 14, 2016, and concluded on April 17, 2016.

From a teleplay by Winter and George Mastras, and story by Cohen, Jagger, Scorsese and Winter, the pilot episode was directed by Scorsese. The first season consisted of ten episodes. Scorsese had hoped to direct further episodes of the series. Winter left his position as showrunner at the end of the first season due to creative differences, leaving the position to Scott Z. Burns.

HBO announced the renewal of Vinyl for a second season on February 18, 2016, soon after the pilot episode premiered. However, on June 22, 2016, HBO reversed that decision and cancelled the series. HBO head of programming Casey Bloys said of the decision, "It didn't land. With limited resources, we didn't think the retooling was worth the producers' time if it would only move the needle a little bit." In October 2018, Scorsese admitted to being heartbroken over the cancellation, describing the decision as "tragic", while also saying that in his opinion, the series would have had a better chance at succeeding if he had been more hands-on with his involvement and directed all episodes.

== Premise ==
The music scene in 1970s New York is still awash in sex and drugs, but rock 'n' roll is giving way to an era of punk, disco and hip-hop. Desperately trying to navigate the changing landscape is American Century Records founder and president Richie Finestra, whose passion for music and discovering talent has gone by the wayside. With his American Century Records on the verge of being sold, a life-altering event rekindles Finestra's professional fire, but it may leave his personal life in ruins.

== Cast ==
=== Main ===
- Bobby Cannavale as Richie Finestra, a record executive trying to resurrect his label American Century.
- Paul Ben-Victor as Maury Gold, a charming, avuncular record company owner.
- P. J. Byrne as Scott Leavitt, the head of legal for American Century.
- Max Casella as Julian "Julie" Silver, the head of A&R of American Century.
- Ato Essandoh as Lester Grimes, a former singer and Richie's ex-colleague.
- James Jagger as Kip Stevens, lead singer of Nasty Bits, a proto-punk band.
- J. C. MacKenzie as Skip Fontaine, head of sales for American Century.
- Jack Quaid as Clark Morelle, a young A&R executive at American Century.
- Ray Romano as Zak Yankovich, head of promotions for American Century.
- Birgitte Hjort Sørensen as Ingrid, a Danish actress favored by Andy Warhol and close friend of Devon.
- Juno Temple as Jamie Vine, an ambitious assistant at American Century's A&R Department.
- Olivia Wilde as Devon Finestra, Richie's wife and former actress/model who was once part of Warhol's Factory scene.

=== Recurring ===
- Susan Heyward as Cece, personal secretary to Richie at American Century.
- Emily Tremaine as Heather, receptionist of American Century.
- Ephraim Sykes as Marvin, A&R rep at American Century.
- MacKenzie Meehan as Penny, A&R rep at American Century.
- Griffin Newman as Casper, a mustachioed A&R rep at American Century.
- Jay Klaitz as Hal Underwood
- Annie Parisse as Andrea "Andie" Zito, Richie's former co-worker.
- John Cameron Mitchell as Andy Warhol
- Bo Dietl as Joe Corso, an "independent promotion man" with possible ties to organized crime.
- Lena Olin as Mrs. Fineman
- Jason Cottle as Detective Whorisky
- Armen Garo as Corrado Galasso
- Michael Drayer as Detective Renk
- Douglas Smith as Gary / Xavier

=== Historical figures ===
Vinyl featured portrayals of a number of musicians, singers and other historical figures of the period, including:

- Christian Peslak as David Johansen, lead singer of New York Dolls
- Jonny D'Ambrosio as Johnny Thunders, guitarist of New York Dolls
- Zebedee Row as Robert Plant, lead singer of Led Zeppelin
- Ian Hart as Peter Grant, manager of Led Zeppelin
- Vince Nudo as John Bonham, drummer of Led Zeppelin
- Kareem Bunton as Bo Diddley, musician, singer-songwriter, and rock and roll pioneer
- Connor Hanwick as Lou Reed, singer-songwriter and guitarist, and a former member of the Velvet Underground
- Natalie Prass as Karen Carpenter, lead singer of the Carpenters
- Dominique Johnson as DJ Kool Herc, DJ and pioneer of hip hop music
- Dustin Ingram as Alice Cooper, lead singer of Alice Cooper
- James Vincent Boland as Jeff Starship, musician and frontman of Sniper
- Matt Bogart as Robert Goulet, actor and traditional pop singer
- C.P. Lacey as Little Richard, pianist, singer-songwriter, and rock and roll pioneer
- Noah Bean as David Bowie, musician, singer-songwriter, and glam rock pioneer
- Wesley Tunison as Gram Parsons, musician, singer-songwriter, and country rock pioneer
- Shawn Klush as Elvis Presley, singer and rock and roll pioneer
- Gene Jones as Colonel Tom Parker, manager of Elvis Presley
- Leslie Kujo as Bob Marley, lead singer and lead guitarist of Bob Marley and the Wailers
- Stephen Sullivan as John Lennon, singer-songwriter and musician, and former member of the Beatles
- David Vadim as Hilly Kristal, owner of New York City club, CBGB
- Ben Mayne as Billy Name, Warhol collaborator and photographer

== Episodes ==
No.	Title	Directed by	Written by	Original release date	US viewers (millions)
1	"Pilot"	Martin Scorsese	Story by : Rich Cohen & Mick Jagger & Martin Scorsese and Terence Winter; Teleplay by : Terence Winter and George Mastras	February 14, 2016	0.764
1973, New York City. Together with his partners, Richie Finestra, President of American Century Records, is on the verge of selling his struggling company to German label Polygram, an impending distribution agreement with Led Zeppelin part of the package. But after an awkward encounter with Robert Plant, it's clear that the sale is in jeopardy.
2	"Yesterday Once More"	Allen Coulter	Terence Winter	February 21, 2016	0.667
With German Polygram executives in town to complete the deal for American Century, Richie delivers a bombshell that shocks the prospective buyers as well as his partners: Zak Yankovich, ACR's head of promotions, and Skip Fontaine, head of sales. When the dust settles, the Germans storm out of the ACR offices, leaving Richie to face the ire of Zak, Skip and company attorney Scott Levitt. In Greenwich, Devon ponders what to do about her husband, who broke his promise by going off the wagon, though her anger is tempered by memories of the man she fell in love with back in 1966, when she was a fixture in the downtown art/music scene and a muse to Andy Warhol. Back at American Century, Richie gives the A&R team members a mandate to land a cutting-edge act or lose their jobs. Jamie, pushing Nasty Bits, is encouraged that Richie is interested in the band, but dismayed she'll be working with A&R head Julius "Julie" Silver, who vows to polish the Bits' sound. A devastated Zak considers changing his alibi for a recent injury, while Richie decides to pay a visit to an estranged mentor.
3	"Whispered Secrets"	Mark Romanek	Jonathan Tropper and Debora Cahn & Adam Rapp	February 28, 2016	0.533
At a record producers' banquet honoring Maury Gold, Richie is embarrassed when the emcee, rival record exec Jackie Jervis, makes a joke about the failed German Polygram deal. Later, Maury and mob cohort Corrado Galasso pay a visit to American Century to probe a detective's recent inquiry, and Joe Corso drops by to pitch Richie a demo by his banquet date, Nora. As Richie cuts down his roster to free up money to sign and promote new artists, junior A&R rep Clark Morelle courts Alice Cooper in an attempt to sign him to a solo deal. Trying to find purpose in the suburbs, Devon turns to Warhol in hopes of raising funds to renovate a Greenwich barn that could house a displaced Russian ballet company. Approaching Lester about releasing some of his old blues demos, Richie reopens old wounds instead. The revamped Nasty Bits fail to win over Richie, prompting Jamie to change up their set list.
4	"The Racket"	S. J. Clarkson	Debora Cahn	March 6, 2016	0.577
In lieu of attending a funeral, Richie takes out his anxieties on a couch during a marriage-counseling session with Devon. Later, over the course of a chaotic day at the office, Richie courts funk superstar Hannibal, agrees to let Robert Goulet record an original song on his upcoming Christmas LP, and gets fired up after an acrimonious meeting with Lester. Meanwhile, Zak and Scott ruminate on their futures in the aftermath of the lost deal with German Polygram. On the verge of signing with American Century, Nasty Bits enlist a new manager to work out a favorable deal with Richie. Armed with photos from Richie's temper tantrum, Devon visits a divorce attorney. Skip looks to unload an overrun of bootleg albums, but finds no takers. As he's about to be detained by two new detectives, Richie learns from Cece that Hannibal is being courted backstage by Jervis, and orders his assistant to do whatever it takes to keep the singer in the stable. Later, Richie visits a downtown jazz club in search of an alibi, while Devon has a meltdown at home.
5	"He in Racist Fire"	Peter Sollett	Adam Rapp	March 13, 2016	0.618
Richie visits his father in order to leverage a favor to his advantage. Devon agrees to join Richie for dinner with Hannibal and Cece, playing up the vixen role to keep one of her husband's biggest clients signed. Kip faces a tough dilemma in the wake of Nasty Bits' recent signing: fire one of his bandmates or lose a prime gig opening for New York Dolls. Desperate to shore up PR at American Century, Richie tries to recruit Andrea Zito, a former employee and flame who now works for Jervis. Clark gets a new job after an emotional meeting with Julie, while an indignant Jamie ends up keeping her old one. Richie has an inspiration for the name of his new label.
6	"Cyclone"	Nicole Kassell	Carl Capotorto & Erin Cressida Wilson	March 20, 2016	0.570
Devon seeks refuge at the Chelsea Hotel with Ingrid, a friend from her Warhol days. Meanwhile, Richie falls into a deeper well of drugs and depravity, enabled by Ingrid's nihilistic boyfriend Ernst. Zito rejoins American Century and immediately outlines her plans to revive the label. Kip follows an unlikely path towards recruiting a new lead guitarist, Alex, for Nasty Bits. Zak allows his raw emotions to surface at the end of his daughter's Bat Mitzvah.
7	"The King and I"	Allen Coulter	David Matthews	March 27, 2016	0.666
Looking to raise cash for his label, a newly sober Richie flies to LA with Zak, hoping to sell the company jet to a rival record exec, Lou Meshejian. After attending a beachfront party teeming with many of Lou's music clients, Richie and Zak head to Las Vegas in hopes of somehow convincing Elvis Presley and his manager, Colonel Tom Parker, to ditch Presley's current label and sign with American Century. The detour includes a steamy encounter in which Zak's fantasies come true, at a price.
8	"E.A.B."	Jon S. Baird	Riccardo DiLoreto & Michael Mitnick	April 3, 2016	0.567
Rebuffed by a loan officer with high school ties to Zak, a desperate Richie approaches Maury about doing a deal with Galasso. Devon and Ingrid travel to Max's Kansas City, where Devon impresses photographer Billy McVicar with her ability to charm John Lennon into giving up his photo. Tasked by Richie to come up with a new song, Nasty Bits get a crash course in the blues from Lester. Zito fires long-time American Century employee Hal Underwood, angering Richie. Clark finds musical enlightenment from his one-time mailroom nemesis, Jorge.
9	"Rock and Roll Queen"	Carl Franklin	Debora Cahn	April 10, 2016	0.753
After an unsettling visit with Devon and the kids, Richie weighs his options as the heat surrounding the Frank "Buck" Rogers murder case is turned up. Thrown out of her aunt's townhouse, Jamie crashes with Kip as Nasty Bits finish their record and do a photo shoot. At American Century, Maury Gold pitches a 50s compilation LP, while Zak tries to fund a band for his wedding singer, Gary, aka "Xavier". Zito tongue-lashes Jamie and Cece for getting romantically involved with the talent. Lester bails when he sees Gold in the conference room. Clark and Jorge bond over an Indigo tune. After receiving a phone call from the hotel in Vegas, Zak realizes what actually transpired that night.
10	"Alibi"	Allen Coulter	Terence Winter	April 17, 2016	0.730
While Richie begins his deal to bring down Galasso, Zak also strikes a deal with him to bring Richie down. The relationship between Nasty Bits' members implodes right as they're about to open for New York Dolls. With Indigo climbing in sales thanks to Clark and Jorge, the group decides to push further with them. Richie goes to Lester in order to get the rights to his song; Lester uses that to his advantage. Galasso holds a meeting with Richie and Zak after one of his operations is discovered by the police; Corso is executed. Kip overdoses. Gary makes suggestions to Zak. Richie resuscitates Kip before the band goes on stage. Richie fires Jamie from working with the band. Nasty Bits perform to an enthusiastic response. Richie meets a handler to give information on Galasso but doesn't mention Corso's murder. At the launch of Alibi Records back at the office, Richie reads reviews of Nasty Bits' performance and gives a speech.

== Music ==
The music for Vinyl was released by Atlantic Records & Warner Bros. Records. The first soundtrack album for the series, titled Vinyl (Music from the HBO® Original Series), Vol. 1, was released on February 12, 2016, two days before the show's premiere date. Three months prior, Icelandic rock band Kaleo released their song "No Good" on November 20, 2015, which was later featured in the second trailer for Vinyl, as well as on the show's Volume 1 & 1.6 soundtrack and EP respectively. After the release of Volume 1, Atlantic and Warner Bros. began featuring EPs for episode 2 to episode 9. Each one was made public on iTunes every week before the premiere of each episode, each featuring five songs.

All the songs featured on Volume 1, The EPs, and Vinyl: The Essentials (Best of Season 1) all consists of a mix of songs recorded from the period between the 1950s and 1970s, covers of songs by contemporary artists such as The Arcs, Julian Casablancas, Trey Songz, Chris Cornell, and Andrew W.K. and original songs written for the show to fit with the style of the period by artists such as Ty Taylor's "The World is Yours", Royal Blood's "Where Are You Now?" and Alex Newell's & DJ Cassidy's "Kill the Lights". Aside from the soundtrack music, the majority of the music featured on Vinyl consists of many genres, including rock, blues, pop, country, jazz, soul, funk, R&B, reggae, punk, disco and hip-hop.

== Reception ==
Vinyl received generally positive reviews from critics. The acting (particularly Cannavale) and directing were generally praised, while the writing and storyline, particularly in the later half of the season, which many called "formulaic" and "familiar", were criticized.

On Rotten Tomatoes the first five episodes (which were given to critics in advance) holds an approval rating of 76%. The site's consensus reads: "Vinyl doesn't always keep the beat, dramatically speaking, but overall, it capably honors the rock pioneers of the '70s with absorbing stories, a spot-on soundtrack, and rich period detail." On another review aggregator, Metacritic, the first five episodes holds a score of 71 out of 100. But as the series progressed, reviews got significantly more critical.

Alan Sepinwall of HitFix gave the first season a B, writing that "there's an awful lot of excess in Vinyl, which perhaps makes sense for a show involving two icons of '70s rock in Jagger and Scorsese. But all of Richie's searching for the next idea, and all of the scenes involving the Nasty Bits or other rising forms of music, suggest a show that really wishes it could strip away all the glam and all the tropes and just do something simple and raw and powerful." Robert Bianco of USA Today wrote that "what follows is a sometimes humorous, sometimes nostalgic, sometimes bumpy ride through the era, with a story that often seems to halt just when it's picking up momentum. Still, every time the story falters, the characters' and the show's obvious love for popular music in all its forms lifts it back up."

On the other hand, Emily Nussbaum of The New Yorker had a mixed response, writing that "the show improves slightly after the jankily paced pilot, but it never sheds its air of leaden nostalgia." Verne Gay of Newsday reacted negatively, writing that the show "is a compelling idea in search of a compelling story. There simply isn't much of one, in fact, and--abhorring the ever-present vacuum--a lot of other elements rush in to fill the void. Scenes are padded, lots of flashbacks are even more flaccid, while actors devour the helpless scenery."

The show was nominated for two Emmy Awards: one for Outstanding Makeup for a Single-Camera Series (Non-Prosthetic) and the other for Main Title Design.

== Cancellation ==
“I was very disappointed. We had a lot more story to tell and a terrific cast, and I was really excited about where it was headed in terms of the music history and the character development. But sometimes, unfortunately, that's the way it goes. This is a tricky business.“ - Terence Winter about the show’s cancellation.

Vinyl's renewal for a second season was announced on February 18, 2016 by HBO's programming president Michael Lombardo. However, HBO announced on June 22, 2016 that they had decided not to proceed with a second season.

== Distribution ==
=== International broadcast ===
In Canada, the series premiered on HBO Canada on February 14, 2016, airing simultaneous with the American broadcast. In the UK, the series premiered on Sky Atlantic on February 15, 2016, airing at 2:00 a.m. initially to simulcast the U.S. premiere and then again at 9:00 p.m. the same day. The Australian premiere aired on Showcase on February 15, 2016. On HBO Asia, the series premiered on February 16, 2016. In New Zealand it premiered on February 15, 2016 on SoHo on Sky TV.

=== Home media ===
The first and only season of Vinyl was released on DVD and Blu-ray on June 7, 2016, by HBO Home Entertainment.

== See also ==
- 1970s nostalgia
