= Powers (American TV series) =

- Genre: Superhero; Police procedural; Drama
- Based on: Powers by: Brian Michael Bendis; Michael Avon Oeming
- Developed by: Brian Michael Bendis; Charlie Huston
- Starring: Sharlto Copley; Susan Heyward; Noah Taylor; Olesya Rulin; Adam Godley; Max Fowler; Michelle Forbes; Eddie Izzard; Michael Madsen
- Composer: Jeff Rona
- Country of origin: United States
- Original language: English
- No. of seasons: 2
- No. of episodes: 20

Production
- Executive producers: David Slade; David Engel; Lawrence Mattis; David Alpert; Frank Frattaroli; Stan Kennis; Michael Dinner; Mike Avon Oeming; Brian Michael Bendis; Rémi Aubuchon; Charlie Huston
- Running time: 39–53 minutes
- Production companies: Circle of Confusion; Jinxworld; Sony Pictures Television

Original release
- Network: PlayStation Network
- Release: March 10, 2015 – July 19, 2016

Powers is an American superhero television series developed by Brian Michael Bendis and Charlie Huston for PlayStation Network. It is based on the Image/Marvel comic book series of the same name by Bendis and Michael Avon Oeming. The show depicts humans who have been granted special abilities, known as "Powers", that remain hidden until adulthood. The show centers around the character Christian Walker, who was once a hero who had the ability to fly and was known as Diamond.

The series was PlayStation Network's first venture into scripted original programming, and it premiered on March 10, 2015, with the final episode of the first season being released on April 28, 2015. It was renewed for a second season of 10 episodes, which premiered on May 31, 2016, and was released through July 19, 2016. The series was canceled in August of the same year.

== Overview ==
In a world where humans and superheroes called "Powers" co-exist, a former Power, Christian Walker, has reinvented himself as a homicide detective after his own powers were taken from him. He and his partner Deena Pilgrim work for the Powers Division of the Los Angeles Police Department, investigating crimes involving superhumans, who are at once crimefighting heroes and pop celebrities managed by specialized advertising agencies.

== Cast ==
=== Main ===
- Sharlto Copley as Christian Walker, formerly known as Diamond – a detective in the Powers Division. Christian was once an indestructible superhero with the ability to fly, and in his identity of Diamond was one of the most acclaimed heroes. However, his powers were later taken from him by his previous mentor, Wolfe. Now Christian uses his experience to help the Powers Division stop destructive Powers.
- Susan Heyward as Deena Pilgrim – Christian's partner in the Powers Division. Her father is a successful retired policeman whom everyone admires.
- Noah Taylor as Johnny Royalle (season 1) – another protégé of Wolfe, and former friend of Christian Walker. He owns the Here and Gone Club (which takes the name from his own motto) where younger Powers often gather. He has the power to teleport at will both himself and objects or people with which he's in contact. His power can prove extremely lethal when used to teleport away parts of a person's body, or the air in a room. Royalle recently synthesized a mysterious substance called Sway, which he plans to give to young Powers to help them enhance their abilities.
- Olesya Rulin as Calista Secor – a wayward girl, possibly homeless. She is a "wannabe" as she hangs around Powers, believing her own powers will awaken someday. She intends to use her powers on her abusive father for hurting her mother. She befriends both Christian and Royalle.
- Adam Godley as Captain Emile Cross – the head of Powers Division. He dislikes all Powers and often argues with Christian and Deena.
- Max Fowler as Krispin Stockley – the teenage son of Christian's deceased former police partner. Krispin feels that the more unstable Powers should be held accountable for their mistakes and goes rage hunting after Powers along with Marigold forming ChaoticChic only to die and ironically come back from the dead as a Power with immortality.
- Michelle Forbes as Janis Sandusky, a.k.a. RetroGirl (season 1) – a very popular, world-renowned Power who dated Christian when they were young and on the same team. They became estranged after Christian lost his powers. RetroGirl's powers include superhuman strength, invulnerability and flight. She's still active as a heroine and celebrity, aiming to use her powers for humanitarian reasons, as in the relief and containment of natural disasters.
- Eddie Izzard as "Big Bad" Wolfe (season 1) – possibly the most powerful and dangerous Power ever born, Wolfe has the ability to drain the life force of both humans and Powers at will, becoming stronger and stronger in the process and fueling a multitude of powers which include extreme strength, speed, and massive regeneration. He is responsible for Christian's loss of powers and is particularly eager to consume Powers, who fuel his ability exponentially. After his capture, Wolfe has been routinely lobotomized in order to keep his powers in check. Triphammer stated that all Wolfe's powers stem from extreme cellular regeneration.
- Michael Madsen as Patrick, a.k.a. SuperShock (season 2) – a three centuries old Power hero who returns from a 40-year retirement following the death of RetroGirl. He was part of the famous Unity team along with RetroGirl and Cobalt Knight, and may be the most powerful Power alive.

=== Recurring ===
- Logan Browning as Zora – a blooming Power kid with the ability to manipulate light. She admires Christian and is pushed by her management into trying to become the next Power big thing.
- Andrew Sensenig as Harley Cohen, a.k.a. Triphammer – a non-powered hero, double amputee, and scientific genius who designed a suit of state-of-the-art armor to fight crime. A former member of the superhero team composed by Christian and RetroGirl, he now watches over the Powers prison and has built a device to drain the superhuman powers. Following RetroGirl's death, he becomes concerned with his legacy and inspiring a new generation of Powers.
- Aaron Farb as Simons (season 1) – Royalle's assistant. He has the power to make multiple copies of himself, each with their own thoughts and personalities. He commonly uses his power to help Royalle, which includes running his club and assisting with his plans.
- Claire Bronson as Candace Stockley (season 1) – Krispin's mother who's a good friend of Christian. She works as a publicist at PAR Agency for powers and takes Zora as a client.
- Justice Leak as Kutter – a detective in Powers Division. He is friends with Christian and respects him, though they often butt heads.
- Nicky Buggs as Eva Hamdam (season 1) – RetroGirl's personal assistant and confidante.
- Jeryl Prescott as Golden (season 1) – a member of Powers Division. She is friends with both Deena and Christian.
- Shelby Steel as Marigold Wygant, better known by her online handle Chaotic Chick – a girl who Krispin meets while playing a Powers-based online game. Like Krispin, she feels that Powers should be held accountable for their mistakes and forms ChaoticChic with him, after a Powers battle resulted in the death of her cousin.
- Michael Lowry as Craig Sherman – a PAR Agency publicist who works for Zora and RetroGirl.
- Charmin Lee as Patrice LeGarde (season 1) – Johny Royalle's lawyer.
- Bianca Amato as Delia Alexander (season 1) – a newscaster who hosts a very popular news show called "One on One with Delia Alexander".
- Jannette Sepwa as Paola Ruiz (season 1) – Zora's assistant and lawyer.
- Leander Suleiman as Mack (season 1) – A member of Powers Division. She is partnered with Argento and attempts to get him to get back in the dating game.
- David Ury as Dr. Death – a mortician who works for Powers Division. He does not get along with Deena.
- Enrico Colantoni as Senator Bailey Brown, a.k.a. The Cobalt Knight (season 2) – a retired hero turned senator who has a hard stance on Powers. He was part of the Unity team along with RetroGirl and SuperShock, but quit to go into politics.
- Tricia Helfer as FBI Special Agent Angela Lange, formerly known by her hero name Lynx (season 2) – a werecat Power hero-turned criminal-turned rehabilitated government agent. She works alongside partner Schlag as an intermediary between Powers Division and the federal government. Angela is also a former flame of Christian.
- Timothy Douglas Perez as FBI Special Agent Schlag (season 2) – the silent, granite-skinned Power who's the partner of Lange and tends to act as the muscle of the pair.
- Jason Wesley as Terrance Pelham (season 2) – a TV reporter for Powers That Be (PTB) News.
- Teri Wyble as Nicole Glantz (season 2) – an investigative reporter for PTB News who's willing to do what needs to be done to move forward in her career.
- Azie Tesfai as Dr. Michelle Marrs (season 2) – the new coroner at Powers divisions, she's amicable and excitable towards powers and immediately becomes friends with Walker and Pilgrim.
- Robin Spriggs as Morrison, a.k.a. The Ghost (season 2) – an apparently ageless Level-10 Power and master manipulator who is endowed with super strength and the ability to disappear. He is the longtime nemesis of SuperShock.
- Wil Wheaton as Conrad Moody (season 2) – the eccentric toymaker and CEO of Colossal Fun who is obsessed with the idea of RetroGirl.
- Raul Casso as Sgt. Tiberio Martinez (season 2) – an amputee USMC veteran and MMA fighter recruited by Harley to test his prosthetic technology, who soon becomes his protégé on the road to becoming a tech-powered hero himself.
- Matthew Yang King as THX (season 2) – a Hack lieutenant who uses implants to change his face. The cyborg's hardware fatally crashes before he can reveal who hired him.

== Episodes ==
| Season | Episodes | Originally released | |
| Season | Episodes | First released | Last released |
|---|---|---|---|
| 1 | 10 | March 10, 2015 | April 28, 2015 |
| 2 | 10 | May 31, 2016 | July 19, 2016 |

=== Season 1 (2015) ===
| No. overall | No. in season | Title | Directed by | Written by | Original release date |
|---|---|---|---|---|---|
| 1 | 1 | "Pilot" | David Slade | Charlie Huston | March 10, 2015 |
At Powers Division of the Los Angeles police force, a detective is killed when a Power breaks free following a routine arrest. As a result Christian Walker, who had become a detective after losing his powers as Diamond, is partnered with Deena Pilgrim who has newly transferred to Powers Division. Their first case is the death of superhero Olympia, found dead in a hotel room by a young homeless woman and Powers groupie named Calista Secor. The detectives interview Calista but she is teleported out of the police station by Johnny Royalle, a criminal Power thought to have been killed years ago by Wolfe. They visit Wolfe in The Shaft, a supermax Powers prison, where Wolfe hints that he will return Walker's powers if freed. Walker tracks down Calista who leaps from a tall building in a desperate attempt to activate the powers she hopes she has. Walker recklessly jumps after her and intercepts her in mid-air, and they are both saved by the timely intervention of RetroGirl.
| 2 | 2 | "Like a Power" | David Slade | Charlie Huston | March 10, 2015 |
Walker wakes up the next morning on the rooftop, having spent the night alone. Olympia's cause of death was a new street drug called "Sway" which is being produced by Johnny Royalle's gang who used Calista to deliver it to the victim. Walker and Pilgrim go to RetroGirl's home to meet with Calista, but she flees. Johnny Royalle legally registers his powers and appears on television denying any criminal aspirations, stating that he faked his death due to rumors that he had been aiding Wolfe's crime spree, and claiming to have returned to help wayward Powers kids by setting up a youth center. Calista meets him there, claiming she has nowhere else to go. Later that night, Royalle teleports into Walker's apartment and threatens Walker to stay out of his way.
| 3 | 3 | "Mickey Rooney Cries No More" | David Petrarca | David Paul Francis | March 10, 2015 |
Powers Division Captain Cross encourages TripHammer to continue experiments in removing the abilities of dangerous Powers despite the deaths of test subjects and the psychological toll. Walker and Pilgrim investigate the death of Levitation Boy who seems to have died as a result of his powers being greatly extended by taking Sway, the same drug connected to Olympia's death. The detectives head to Johnny Royalle's club where RetroGirl arrives with Calista, and witness Sway being passed around the club with no money changing hands. Walker and Pilgrim apprehend Calista but Johnny Royalle stops them from leaving, and Calista decides to stay with him. After the others leave, Royalle teleports into Wolfe's cell to witness him dismembering and eating a doctor who had been regularly lobotomizing him in pace with his regeneration as the only means of keeping his dangerous powers in check. Wolfe pleads with Royalle to let him go home as Royalle looks on in horror.
| 4 | 4 | "Devil in a Garbage Bag" | David Petrarca | Allison Moore | March 17, 2015 |
Wolfe kills several prison guards; Johnny Royalle urges Wolfe to leave the prison but Wolfe won't give up his vendetta against those who tortured him and Royalle is forced to leave. Walker and Pilgrim meet with TripHammer who has experimented with the Drainer, his invention that suppresses the abilities of Powers, and develop a plan to neutralize Wolfe but it fails and several guards are killed. Walker traps Pilgrim in a cell to protect her and confronts Wolfe alone, trying to reason with him but Wolfe refuses to stop his rampage. Meanwhile, Royalle prepares to leave the city, revealing to Calista that Sway is simply Wolfe's blood; those Powers who take it temporarily gain Wolfe's ability to absorb and increase powers. Royalle evacuates Calista who convinces him that he can't run away from this so he teleports back to Wolfe's cell where he finds himself under the Drainer, trapped without his powers.
| 5 | 5 | "Paint It Black" | Bill Eagles | Julie Siege | March 24, 2015 |
In flashbacks, Wolfe lectures Powers kids including Johnny Royalle and Walker on responsibility, then is shown eating bodies in a killing spree; Walker convinces an uncertain Royalle to capture Wolfe and become heroes. In the present, Wolfe kills and eats imprisoned Powers and remembers that he took Walker's powers and Walker put him in The Shaft. Wolfe becomes enraged and clashes with Walker, who has taken Sway and gets inside Wolfe's mind where Wolfe denies any ability to return Walker's powers. Zora intervenes and is joined by RetroGirl, but Wolfe defeats them both. Walker re-engages with Wolfe and regains his powers, throwing Wolfe into the Drainer, then immediately collapses in pain. Royalle exits his cell and his powers return, allowing him to leave. Zora comes to and takes credit for stopping Wolfe. Walker awakens in hospital with RetroGirl at his side, and supports Zora's story rather than explain temporarily regaining his powers. Walker and RetroGirl comfort each other and she falls asleep in his hospital bed. Later, Walker opens his eyes which glow red as they had during his clash with Wolfe.
| 6 | 6 | "The Raconteur of the Funeral Circuit" | Mikael Salomon | Allison Moore & David Paul Francis | March 31, 2015 |
Powers Division holds a memorial for the officers who died in the fight with Wolfe. Walker asks TripHammer if the Drainer could somehow return his powers and reveals to RetroGirl that he'd temporarily regained his powers to defeat Wolfe. Zora gives her condolences but leaves when her publicist criticizes her behavior with the grieving families. A very drunk TripHammer hints to Walker and RetroGirl of the Black Swan initiative, which Captain Cross says are preparations for a coming change. Meanwhile, Royalle shuts down his Sway operations. He uses his teleportation ability to attempt to remove Sway from a copy of Simons but badly injures him. Another copy of Simons gives Calista the last capsule of Sway as a punishment. Wolfe delivers a televised statement from The Shaft, stating that having his powers temporarily removed by the Drainer has made him realize the extent of his crimes, and he requests that his powers be permanently removed.
| 7 | 7 | "You Are Not It" | Aaron Lipstadt | Remi Aubuchon & Allison Moore | April 7, 2015 |
Walker and Pilgrim serve a warrant at Royalle's club where they are attacked by Simons whom they arrest and throw under a Drainer at Powers Division. A copy of Simons has been confiscating Sway from the Power Kids and collapses as the cloning ability is suppressed. Calista tells Royalle who rushes to find Simons suffering from the death of his copy. Using this to prove the Drainer harms Powers, Royalle gets a meeting with Wolfe, and explains how Walker used Sway to temporarily regain his powers. Wolfe tells Royalle that the Drainer occasionally turns off and he can feel the Sway in the Powers Kids, making it easy for him to hunt and consume them when he escapes. Later, Walker meets with Wolfe who again offers to return Walker's powers for freedom. Royalle returns to find Calista in pain after taking Sway; Walker grabs Royalle who teleports them both away. Elsewhere, a Power is ambushed and has her throat slit, with "Kaotic Chic" spray-painted over her body.
| 8 | 8 | "Aha Shake Heartbreak" | Tim Hunter | Julie Siege | April 14, 2015 |
Johnny Royalle teleports Walker to his secret bunker and suggests putting aside their differences for a team-up to kill Wolfe and save the Powers Kids. TripHammer admits to RetroGirl that Black Swan is a Powers doomsday scenario, for which his Drainer was designed as a countermeasure. Calista awakens and is arrested by Pilgrim, who finds evidence on Calista's phone connecting her to "Kaotic Chic" and Krispin, the conflicted son of Walker's dead partner. At a benefit hosted by RetroGirl and Zora, Krispin disrupts a staged fight between Zora and another Power. Krispin's mother tries to intervene and is accidentally killed by the Power, who had used Sway to aid his performance. Witnessing this, Walker agrees to Royalle's proposal to kill Wolfe.
| 9 | 9 | "Level 13" | Bill Eagles | Brian Michael Bendis | April 21, 2015 |
Walker informs Pilgrim, Cross and TripHammer of Johnny Royalle's proposal to kill Wolfe, and they set a trap to neutralize and arrest Royalle in Wolfe's cell. Walker later informs Royalle of this, claiming it was the only way to get close to Wolfe. Royalle gains Calista's release and she attempts to comfort Krispin at his mother's funeral but he sends her away when he sees she brought Royalle. Walker and Royalle infiltrate The Shaft and Royalle is trapped under the Drainer in Wolfe's cell, but as Walker confronts Wolfe (to get his powers back) he finds it is an imposter. With Royalle in custody, the real Wolfe is ordered back to his cell but Simons, earlier freed by Royalle to create diversions, kills his guards. Wolfe drains Simons, overpowers TripHammer, and confronts Walker, telling him that he needs to talk to both Walker and Royalle.
| 10 | 10 | "F@#K the Big Chiller" | Mikael Salomon | Charlie Huston & Allison Moore | April 28, 2015 |
Zora fights Wolfe on the streets but is severely beaten. Wolfe goes to Royalle's club where the Powers Kids have gathered, and tells Calista that she is something special. Pilgrim evacuates the kids but they do not get far as Wolfe drains them all, gaining enormous power. Royalle teleports Wolfe several thousand feet up and drops him through the roof. RetroGirl tries to fight Wolfe but is overpowered. Desperate, Walker holds an explosive Drainer between himself and Wolfe and sets it off, suppressing Wolfe's powers while losing any hope of regaining his own. Wolfe seems to send the last of his power to Calista before Royalle seizes the opportunity to teleport Wolfe's head off his body. Royalle is hailed as the hero and pardoned. RetroGirl recovers while Zora is stabilized at hospital. Krispin and Kaotic Chic are shown plotting, after which Walker is called to a murder scene where RetroGirl's body lies on a sheet with "Kaotic Chic" on it. Calista again steps off the roof from the first episode, and with red eyes takes flight.

=== Season 2 (2016) ===
| No. overall | No. in season | Title | Directed by | Written by | Original release date |
|---|---|---|---|---|---|
| 11 | 1 | "Caracas, 1967" | Mikael Salomon | Remi Aubuchon | May 31, 2016 |
Krispin and Marigold each go into hiding after being framed for RetroGirl's murder and set up to die delivering a bomb to a Powers Division press conference. Krispin reaches out to Walker but is found dead in an apparent suicide. Meanwhile, Calista uses her newfound powers to beat up her estranged father and steal RetroGirl's costume.
| 12 | 2 | "Funeral of the Century" | Rod Hardy | Brian Michael Bendis | May 31, 2016 |
Powers Division tries to calm tensions between rival gangs the Hacks (cyborgs) and Quants (powers) but an outside force provokes them toward a gang war. Zora becomes an internet joke and demands Craig take down her ads. Demonstrators clash outside RetroGirl's funeral, where Calista makes her debut in RetroGirl's costume and beats-up an unruly Rainbow. Walker spots Krispin in the crowd and chases him to a sex club, catching him. It proves to be THX, a Hack lieutenant, using tech implants to change his face.
| 13 | 3 | "Hell Night" | Mikael Salomon | David Simkins | May 31, 2016 |
THX is taken to Triphammer for interrogation but the cyborg's hardware fatally crashes before he can reveal who hired him. Ambitious Powers That Be reporter Nicole initiates looting at Colossal Fun, merchandiser of Powers-related toys. Kutter comes to Pilgrim's aid in the midst of the riot; they join Zora attempting to separate dozens of Quantums and Hacks vying for control of the city. The violence is stopped by the return of SuperShock after forty years in seclusion. At the same time, Walker finds Marigold but Heavy (Stefan Rollins) drops a building on them.
| 14 | 4 | "Stealing Fire" | Jonathan Frakes | Ben Edlund | June 7, 2016 |
Pilgrim is conflicted over her relationship with Kutter while watching over comatose Walker. Cross and Triphammer deduce a non-registered gravity power was responsible. Believing the suspect may be in the Federal database, Walker seduces Lange to gain access to her laptop; in response, Lange and the FBI take over Powers Division. Meanwhile, PAR agent Craig is pressured to get the new RetroGirl and a tip from a paid informant with Powers That Be lets him make contact with Calista while Nicole's ambush tactics convince Calista that she needs his help. Craig introduces Calista to merchandising magnate Conrad Moody (Wil Wheaton). Throughout, flashbacks show Walker's past relationship with Angela "Lynx" Lange, dating while they were powers, and later arresting her for Powers Division.
| 15 | 5 | "Shaking the Tree" | David Solomon | Allison Moore | June 14, 2016 |
Walker and Pilgrim continue to pursue the RetroGirl case and tie several leads together when there is an attempt on their lives. Lange refuses to break ranks, so Walker appears on Powers That Be and blows Heavy's identity as a covert Federal asset who went rogue a decade earlier; both Walker and Pilgrim are suspended. Senator Bailey Brown (Enrico Colantoni), whose anti-powers legislation is put on hold when his S&M video is leaked to the media, tells Walker his part in trying to mentor Heavy and implies the secret Federal program is dangerous and far-reaching. SuperShock later visits Brown and they mourn the loss of their former Unity partner, RetroGirl. Also, Calista grows closer to Moody and moves into an apartment at Colossal Fun. Triphammer recruits Zora who begins training with Martinez.
| 16 | 6 | "Requiem" | Aaron Lipstadt | Linda McGibney | June 21, 2016 |
Heavy kills Triphammer, who bequeaths his estate to Zora and Martinez. Calista memorializes RetroGirl and Triphammer at a Colossal Fun gala. Her agent, Craig Sherman, suicides over pressure to testify, and the murder scene is found at his agency. Walker and Pilgrim are attacked by Heavy allowing the FBI to get a drainer on him and take him into Federal custody. Suspicions leads the detectives to confront the person who ordered RetroGirl's death.
| 17 | 7 | "Origins" | J. Miller Tobin | David Simkins | June 28, 2016 |
Senator Brown's body is discovered in his constituency office. Nicole tracks down the dominatrix from his S&M video who claims her stalker ex-boyfriend is the murderer but he proves to have an alibi. Calista asks Walker to coach herself, Zora and Martinez. Walker's migraines worsen. SuperShock claims The Ghost killed Brown and is after him. Throughout, SuperShock's origins are shown, with antagonist The Ghost and ally Janis.
| 18 | 8 | "Chasing Ghosts" | Matt Earl Beesley | Mac Marshall | July 5, 2016 |
Krispin returns from the dead, haunted by Marigold. Calista kills her estranged father when he seeks her aid in conducting a bank robbery. A troubled SuperShock takes Walker to his remote mountaintop cabin, where Walker finds a letter Janis left for Brown that "SuperShock must be subdued or destroyed". Pilgrim sets down boundaries with Kutter; in Walker's absence, they investigate The Ghost who stabs Kutter.
| 19 | 9 | "Slain Dragons" | Aaron Lipstadt | Brian Michael Bendis | July 12, 2016 |
Walker is returned to L.A. and finds Krispin who is registering his power. Walker and Pilgrim clash over whether Morrison is real or the delusion of an insane SuperShock. Powers begin dropping out of the sky in an apparent spree killing, and Pilgrim is exposed to powers residue. Calista flees into a dampener cell where Walker and Zora inspire her to return to fight SuperShock. Pilgrim follows a lead to The Ghost who, unable to beat SuperShock, has engineered his self-destruction. The story is intercut with flashbacks of Walker having lost his powers and being invited by Cross to join the new Powers Division.
| 20 | 10 | "Legacy" | Mikael Salomon | Michael Avon Oeming | July 19, 2016 |
SuperShock is lured to Powers Division, demanding they hand over The Ghost, but on seeing Morrison denies that it is his old arch-enemy. Pilgrim instinctually uses her borrowed powers to kill Morrison, but afterwards is hospitalized by SuperShock. The New Unity find SuperShock and ask him to allow them to take over his work; he says the world would be better without powers, and they fight. Despite the heroes' efforts, Supershock is more than a match for their combined might and defeats them all. Walker confronts SuperShock as Diamond, trying to calm him down, but Supershock remains focused on killing the youngsters, after which he says he'll go after Morrison. Walker gets his attention claiming to have been Morrison the whole time, stating that it will only end when they are both dead. At Walker's prompt SuperShock is goaded into flying them both into the sun. In the midst of the panic, Brown's Anti-Powers Legislation is brought to an emergency session of Congress, where it is declared that all Powers will be prohibited from operating in public. During the post-credits, Walker is revealed to have apparently survived, and is being monitored by unknown specimens, who have apparently done so for "ten iterations". One tells the other to put him through the second trial to find out what he is really made of; the screen fades to white, followed by Walker's scream.

== Production ==
=== Development for FX ===
Sony Pictures had optioned the series for film production in 2001. Powers television show began the development on FX in 2009, with Brian Michael Bendis as the writer of the pilot for the show. In February 2011, a greenlit pilot of the show scripted by Charles H. Eglee was announced as a co-production by Sony Pictures Television and FX Networks. Soon after, Charles S. Dutton became the first cast member in May when he signed on to play Captain Cross. Imminent filming in Chicago within weeks was announced in June. The following week, Lucy Punch was cast as Deena Pilgrim. Katee Sackhoff had campaigned for the part. Although FX was rumored to be courting Kyle Chandler for the part of Walker, Jason Patric was cast in the part. Later in June, Carly Foulkes was cast as RetroGirl and Bailee Madison as Calista.

Filming on the pilot began in Chicago in early July 2011 and ended in early August. In November, FX began to retool and reshoot the Powers pilot. Bendis wrote at the time that the reshoots were planned for January and were "all about tone and clarity". In April 2012, more scripts were ordered and writing continued, but reshoots and recasting were being discussed by the network.

=== Move to PlayStation Network ===
Instead of premiering on FX, Powers became the first original television series for the PlayStation Network, and was announced to stream exclusively on PlayStation consoles in December 2014. That year in the summer, Susan Heyward, Max Fowler, and Adam Godley were cast as Deena Pilgrim, Krispin Stockley, and Captain Cross. Eddie Izzard, Noah Taylor, and Olesya Rulin were cast in the roles of "Big Bad" Wolfe, Johnny Royalle, and Calista. Sharlto Copley was cast as Christian Walker and Michelle Forbes as RetroGirl. Mario Lopez guest stars in the pilot episode as the host of Extra wondering about Walker's current whereabouts.

The series was renewed for a second season in May 2015 for 10 episodes. It was canceled in August 2016.

== Release ==
A trailer for Powers premiered at New York Comic-Con in Autumn 2014. Marking PlayStation Network's first venture into scripted original programming, the series debuted on March 10, 2015. The final episode of the first season was released on April 28, 2015. The pilot episode is available for free for people in the United States on YouTube, and the entire first season was available on Crackle from November 2015, until May 2016.

The second season of 10 episodes premiered on May 31, 2016, with the final episode released on July 19, 2016.

== Reception ==
The first season received mixed reviews from critics. On Rotten Tomatoes it has a score of 48% based on 29 critic reviews, with an average score of 4.6/10. The critical consensus reads: "The interplay between the characters lacks spark, but the detailed world-building of Powers shows potential". On Metacritic, it has a score of 51 out of 100, indicating "mixed or average reviews".
