= David Vadim =

Ukrainian-American actor

- Девід Вадим
- Born: 28 March 1972 (age 54); UkrSSR, Soviet Union
- Years active: 1994-present

David Vadim (Ukrainian: Девід Вадим; born March 28, 1972) is a Ukrainian-American actor who appeared in the movies Air Force One, Exit Wounds, G.I. Jane and Punisher: War Zone. He is a former boxing champion and has performed on stage off-Broadway, and on various tours throughout the country. He has recently worked on the TV shows Allegiance and Daredevil.

== Filmography ==
=== Film ===
| Year | Title | Role | Notes |
|---|---|---|---|
| 1994 | Little Odessa | Sasha Aronov | |
| 1996 | The Pallbearer | An Abernathy Cousin | |
| 1996 | Ransom | Cop #5 | |
| 1997 | Air Force One | Igor Nevsky | |
| 1997 | G.I. Jane | Cortez | |
| 1997 | A Small Taste of Heaven | | Short |
| 1998 | Side Streets | Josif Iscovescu | |
| 1998 | Dating Games | Mark | |
| 2000 | Looking for an Echo | Tommie Pirelli | |
| 2001 | Brooklyn Babylon | Judah | |
| 2001 | Exit Wounds | Matt Montini | |
| 2003 | I Am Woody | Sammy | Short |
| 2004 | X, Y | Dispatcher | |
| 2004 | Love Rome | David Vadim (uncredited) | |
| 2006 | 5up 2down | Amir | |
| 2007 | Rockaway | Yuri | |
| 2008 | Punisher: War Zone | Cristu Bulat | |
| 2009 | Staten Island | Tall Man | |
| 2010 | Holy Rollers | Mr. Maxim | |
| 2011 | The Briefcase | Khakis | |
| 2020 | The Last Thing He Wanted | Buck Pearson | |
| 2021 | Payback | Ruslan | |

=== Television ===
| Year | Title | Role | Notes |
|---|---|---|---|
| 1998 | New York Undercover | Sage Ryan | Episode: "The Unusual Suspects" |
| 2000 | Third Watch | Jack | Episode: "Demolition Derby" |
| 2001–2005 | Law & Order | Robert Kelly; Johnny Zona | Episode: "Phobia"; Episode: "Ghosts" |
| 2003 | Street Time | Burt Kent | Episode: "20 Hits" |
| 2003 | Hack | Manny | Episodes: "Presumed Guilty", "Collateral Damage" |
| 2005 | Law & Order: Trial by Jury | Detective Saunders | Episode: "Truth or Consequences" |
| 2005 | Rescue Me | Paulie | 3 episodes |
| 2006 | The Path to 9/11 | Kevin Shea | Mini-series; 2 episodes |
| 2008 | New Amsterdam | Carney | Episode: "Reclassified" |
| 2008 | Fringe | Michael Kelly | Mini-series; episode: "The Dreamscape" |
| 2009 | One Life to Live | Sergei | 12 episodes |
| 2010 | Law & Order: Criminal Intent | Valeyev | Episode: "Broad Channel" |
| 2010 | Boardwalk Empire | Abe Attel (uncredited) | Episode: "A Return to Normalcy" |
| 2013 | Blue Bloods | Vigor Kovacs | Episode: "Lost and Found" |
| 2013–2016 | The Americans | Nikolai Timoshev | Episodes: "Pilot", "Pastor Tim" |
| 2014 | The Blacklist | Pytor Madrczyk | Episode: "The Alchemist (No. 101)" |
| 2014 | Person of Interest | Marko Jevtic | Episode: "Honor Among Thieves" |
| 2015 | Daredevil | Sergei | 3 episodes |
| 2015–2016 | Madam Secretary | Luka Melnik / Ukrainian Foreign Minister Luka Melnik | Episodes: "The Greater Good", "Unity Node" |
| 2016 | Vinyl | Hilly Kristal | Episode: "Alibi" |
| 2018 | Roeng | Sergei | 4 episodes |
| 2019 | Blindspot | Konstantin Valenov | Episode: "Frequently Recurring Struggle for Existence" |
| 2020 | The Good Fight | Niko | Episode: "The Gang Discovers Who Killed Jeffrey Epstein" |
| 2021 | Nightbirds | | Episode: "Pilot" |
| 2024 | The Penguin | Vasily Kosov | Mini-series; 2 episodes |
