= Rich Cohen =

American non-fiction writer

- Born: July 30, 1968 (age 58); Lake Forest, Illinois, U.S.
- Occupations: Non-fiction writer, journalist, screenplay writer
- Writing career
- Period: 1992–present
- Notable works: Tough Jews (1998); Sweet and Low (2006); Monsters (2013); Vinyl (2016)
- Website: authorrichcohen.com

Rich Cohen (born July 30, 1968) is an American non-fiction writer. He is a contributing editor at Vanity Fair and Rolling Stone. He is co-creator, with Martin Scorsese, Mick Jagger and Terence Winter, of the 2016 HBO series Vinyl. His works have been New York Times bestsellers, New York Times Notable Books, and have been collected in the Best American Essays series. He lives in Ridgefield, Connecticut, with his wife and children.

== Early life ==
Cohen was born into a Jewish family in Lake Forest, Illinois, and grew up in Chicago's North Shore suburb of Glencoe. He received his BA from Tulane University in 1990. His father, the negotiator Herb Cohen, grew up with the broadcaster Larry King; Cohen worked on King's CNN show for a short time after graduation. His sister, Sharon Cohen Levin, is an Assistant United States Attorney of the Southern District of New York. His brother, Steve Cohen, a former aide to New York governor Andrew Cuomo, is a partner at the law firm Zuckerman Spaeder in New York City.

== Career ==
=== Journalism ===
An admirer of the works of journalists A. J. Liebling, Ian Frazier, and Joseph Mitchell, Cohen took a job as a messenger at the offices of The New Yorker magazine, where he published twelve stories in the "Talk of the Town" section in eighteen months. After working as a reporter for the New York Observer, in 1994 Cohen joined the staff of Rolling Stone. Since 2007, he has been a contributing editor at Vanity Fair. In 2022, Cohen became a columnist for the Wall Street Journal.

=== Author ===
Cohen published his first book Tough Jews: Fathers, Sons, and Gangster Dreams—a non-fiction account of the Jewish gangsters of 1930s Brooklyn, notably those involved with Murder, Inc.—in 1998. Cohen's second work, The Avengers: A Jewish War Story (2000), follows a group of anti-Nazi partisans in the forests of Lithuania at the close of World War II.

Cohen's third work, the memoir Lake Effect was published in 2002. In 2006, Cohen published Sweet and Low: A Family Story, a memoir about the creation of the artificial sweetener, a product invented by Benjamin Eisenstadt, Cohen's grandfather.

In 2009, Cohen published Israel is Real: An Obsessive Quest to Understand the Jewish Nation and its History. In 2010, Cohen co-wrote the memoir When I Stop Talking, You'll Know I'm Dead, the story of American film producer Jerry Weintraub. The book was a New York Times bestseller.

Cohen's story of United Fruit president and banana king Sam Zemurray, The Fish That Ate the Whale, was published by Farrar, Straus & Giroux in 2012. In 2013, Cohen published Monsters: The 1985 Chicago Bears and the Wild Heart of Football, a story of football through the eyes of the 1985 Chicago Bears. The book was a New York Times best seller. Cohen's next book, a narrative history of The Rolling Stones called The Sun and The Moon and the Rolling Stones, was published by Spiegel and Grau in May 2016. Cohen had been on close terms with the Rolling Stones since the mid-1990s.

In May 2022, Cohen published The Adventures of Herbie Cohen, World's Greatest Negotiator, about Cohen's father, Herb Cohen.

=== Film and television ===
On February 26, 2007, Paramount Pictures announced it had closed a deal to produce The Long Play, a screenplay which Cohen wrote several drafts for and did research on, for producers Mick Jagger and Martin Scorsese, with Scorsese directing.

In 2012 and 2013 Cohen was an advisor on the Starz series Magic City.

Cohen is a co-creator, with Martin Scorsese, Mick Jagger and Terence Winter, of the HBO series Vinyl.

== Critical reception ==
In 2013, NPR editor Tina Brown called Cohen's essay on the financier Ted Forstmann "very entertaining" and a "must read".

In The New York Times Book Review, writer Vincent Patrick called Cohen's book Tough Jews "marvelous and colorful" with "writing good enough to cause one, at times, to reread a page in order to savor the description". Another New York Times critic Christopher Lehmann-Haupt, called it "exuberant" and "a vivid narrative"; Cohen's book had "taken the noise of these facts and turned it from gunfire into a kind of music".

Critic Michiko Kakutani called Cohen's Sweet and Low "a classic" ... "A telling—and often hilarious—parable about the pursuit and costs of the American Dream". In 2006, the book made the New York Times list of 100 notable books.

In The New York Times Book Review, writer Tony Horwitz said Israel is Real "accomplished the miraculous. It made a subject that has vexed me since childhood into a riveting story."

Critic and historian Mark Lewis called The Fish That Ate the Whale "Kiplingesque" and "fascinating." In The Christian Science Monitor, critic Chris Hartman called the book "masterful and elegantly written ... a cautionary tale for the ages".

Reviewing The Last Pirate of New York in the Wall Street Journal, Rinker Buck wrote, "'The Last Pirate of New York' is history-lite at its best, and readers will finish it with a satisfaction deeply relevant today."

=== Awards ===
- 2009 The Best American Essays of 2008

== Select bibliography ==
- — (1999). Tough Jews: Fathers, Sons and Gangster Dreams. Vintage. ISBN 978-0-09-975791-7. OCLC 877546776.
- — (2001). The Avengers: A Jewish War Story. Vintage Books. ISBN 978-0-375-70529-8. OCLC 48155659.
- — (2003). Lake Effect. Vintage. ISBN 978-0-09-928705-6. OCLC 1181426522.
- — (2005). Machers and Rockers: Chess Records and the Business of Rock 'n' Roll. Profile. ISBN 978-1-86197-766-3. OCLC 58554237.
- — (2007). Sweet and Low: A Family Story. Farrar, Straus and Giroux. ISBN 978-0-312-42601-9. OCLC 105485940.
- — (2010). Israel is Real. ISBN 978-0-312-42976-8. OCLC 475447642.
- — (2013). The Fish that Ate the Whale: The Life and Times of America's Banana King. ISBN 978-1-250-03331-4. OCLC 809411728.
- — (2013). Alex and the Amazing Time Machine. Illustrated by Kelly Murphy. Macmillan. ISBN 978-1-250-02729-0. OCLC 859394564.
- — (2014). Monsters: The 1985 Chicago Bears and the Wild Heart of Football. ISBN 978-1-250-05604-7. OCLC 868276611.
- — (2017). The Sun & the Moon & the Rolling Stones. ISBN 978-1-4722-1804-9. OCLC 1073032200.
- — (2018). The Chicago Cubs: Story of a Curse. ISBN 978-1-250-19278-3. OCLC 1062803393.
- — (2020). The Last Pirate of New York: A Ghost Ship, a Killer, and the Birth of a Gangster Nation. ISBN 978-0-399-58994-2. OCLC 1243500700.
- — (2022). Pee Wees: Confessions of a Hockey Parent. Picador. ISBN 978-1-250-82953-5. OCLC 1246141700.
- — (2022). The Adventures of Herbie Cohen: World's Greatest Negotiator. ISBN 978-0-374-16961-9. OCLC 1264275629.
- — (2023). When the Game Was War: The NBA's Greatest Season. Random House. ISBN 9780593229545. OCLC 1346365436.

Ghostwritten

- —; Weintraub, Jerry (2011). When I Stop Talking, You'll Know I'm Dead: Useful Stories from a Persuasive Man. Twelve. ISBN 978-0-446-54816-8. OCLC 1073614353.
- —; Sharapova, Maria (2020). Unstoppable: My Life So Far. ISBN 978-0-221-07048-8. OCLC 1157294486.
