= Daniel J. Watts =

American actor

- Born: July 24, 1982 (age 44); North Carolina, U.S.
- Education: Elon University (BFA, 2004)
- Occupation: Actor
- Website: www.wattswords.com

Daniel J. Watts (born July 24, 1982, in North Carolina) is an American actor. He received his BFA from the Elon University Musical Theatre Program in 2004. He has served as an artist-in-residence at Arizona State University.

== Filmography ==
=== Film ===
Year	Production	Role	Notes
2005	Among Brothers	Billy	
2013	Breakup at a Wedding	Tyrone Clemens	
2014	Freedom	Siding Slave 2	
2017	Had She Never Asked Me	Performer	Short film (Writer & Performer)
2018	BodyMore	Brandon Upton	Short film
2020	Sylvie's Love	The Impressionist	Voice Role
2020	Scenes from Sweet Lorraine	James Baldwin	Short film

=== Television ===
Year(s)	Production	Role	Notes
2013	Smash	Dancer	2 episodes
2014	Boardwalk Empire	Episode: "What Jesus Said"	
2015	Person of Interest	Marcus Young	Episode: "M.I.A."
2015	Broad City	Hot Guy	Episode: "St. Mark's"
2016	The Good Wife	Clayton Riggs	Episode: "Judged"
2016	Blue Bloods	Adrian Cooke	Episode: "Fresh Start"
2016	Vinyl	Hannibal	2 episodes
2016	Odd Mom Out	Ticket Taker	Episode: "Hamming It Up"
2016	The Night Of	Holding Cell Inmate	Episode: "The Art of War"
2016	Blindspot	Freddy	3 episodes
2017	She's Gotta Have It	Dog #3	Episode: "#DaJumpoff (DOCTRINE)"
2018	The Deuce	Chauncy	2 episodes
2018–19	The Last O.G.	Felony	18 episodes
2019	The Marvelous Mrs. Maisel	Henry	4 episodes
2022	Werewolf by Night	Barasso	Disney+ television special
2023	Great Performances	Catesby Ratcliffe	Episode: "Richard III"
2023–25	The Chi	Pastor Ezekiel	21 episodes
2024	The Penguin	Bruno Tess	Mini-series; 5 episodes

== Theatre ==
Year(s)	Production	Role(s)	Location	Category
2006-07	The Color Purple	Bobby, Ensemble, Swing	Broadway Theatre	Broadway
2008-09	The Little Mermaid	Ensemble	Lunt-Fontanne Theatre	Broadway
2009-11	Memphis	Ensemble	Shubert Theatre	Broadway
2010-11	In the Heights	Ensemble	Richard Rodgers Theatre	Broadway
2012	Ghost The Musical	Ensemble, Understudy	Lunt-Fontanne Theatre	Broadway
2013-14	After Midnight	Ensemble, Understudy	Brooks Atkinson Theatre	Broadway
2014-15	Motown: The Musical	Ensemble	Lunt-Fontanne Theatre	Broadway
2015	Whorl Inside a Loop	Flex	Second Stage Theatre	Off-Broadway
2015-16	Hamilton	Samuel Seabury, Ensemble	Richard Rodgers Theatre	Broadway
2016	The Death of the Last Black Man in the Whole Entire World	Black Man with Watermelon	Signature Theatre	Off-Broadway
2017	Lights Out: Nat "King" Cole	Sammy Davis Jr.	Malvern PA, People's Light Theatre	Regional
2019	Lights Out: Nat "King" Cole	Sammy Davis Jr.	Los Angeles, Geffen Playhouse	Regional
2019–22	Tina	Ike Turner	Lunt-Fontanne Theatre	Broadway
2021	The Jam: Only Child	Writer & Performer	Signature Theatre	Off-Broadway (streaming)
2021	The Last of the Love Letters	Actor	Atlantic Theater Company	Off-Broadway

== Awards and nominations ==
Year	Award	Category	Work	Result	Ref
2018	Barrymore Awards	Outstanding Supporting Performance in a Musical	Lights Out: Nat "King" Cole	Won	
2020	Outer Critics Circle Award	Outstanding Featured in a Musical	Tina	Won	
2020	Tony Awards	Best Performance by a Featured Actor in a Musical	Tina	Nominated	
