= Shawn Klush =

Elvis tribute artist (born 1969)

Shawn Klush live

Shawn Klush (born June 17, 1969, Pittston, Pennsylvania) is an American Elvis tribute artist who regularly tours around the world.

== Early life ==
Shawn Klush was born and raised in Pittston, Pennsylvania. He graduated from Seton Catholic High School in Pittston in 1988. Klush's love for music led him to begin imitating his musical idol, Elvis Presley. Klush's father was a radio disc jockey. From an early age, Klush listened to Elvis singing. He studied guitar, and eventually joined a local band called Night Moves, with members Joseph Bruno, Dan Gardner, George Guman, and Charlie Newcomb.

== Early career ==
Klush first began performing as an Elvis tribute artist at resorts in the Poconos region of Pennsylvania. During a tour of Canada, he entered and won the $5,000 prize in the "Worldwide Elvis Competition" in Montreal. He was hired by the producers of the Las Vegas show Legends in Concert to star as 'Elvis' in the company's Branson, Missouri production in 2004. He also alternated in their Las Vegas and Atlantic City show rooms. Each January he stars in the "Elvis Birthday Tribute Tour," an Elvis show with Elvis' original musicians, singers, and closest friends, in multiple cities. Klush also performed at Burnley Mechanics and performed at the Bolton Arena with Justin Shandor, Gordon Hendricks, Steve Preston, DJ Fontana, and The Sweet Inspirations.

== Personal life ==
Shawn's wife Beverly died in April 2024. They have two children, Shelby and Troy.

== Competitions and honors ==
In addition to winning the "Worldwide Elvis Competition" in Montreal on January 6, 2005, Klush became grand champion at the $25,000 "World Elvis Tribute Artist Competition" hosted by Potawatomi Casino that same year. He has received "The People's Choice Award" from Gibson Guitar in Nashville as "Best Concert Elvis". In 2007, Klush was named the international champion of BBC One's [World's Greatest Elvis Competition in the United Kingdom by BBC1 Network U.K. Klush was chosen by Graceland as the winner of Elvis Presley Enterprises first ever Ultimate Tribute Artist Contest in Memphis, Tennessee, and is the only Elvis tribute artist officially endorsed and approved by Elvis Presley Enterprises.

According to Klush in a rare interview "I've won every one (Elvis Presley tribute artist competition) I ever attempted. I don't like them. I don't feel Elvis felt like he was in competition with anyone. (However) I graciously accept the awards (for winning) but I never stop working on my craft."

Klush has many times been dubbed by the news media as "The closest to The King in concert" including The Chicago Tribune, The Las Vegas Sun and Newsweek Magazine.

In 2024, Klush was announced as an inductee into the Luzerne County Arts & Entertainment Hall of Fame.

== Television ==
In 1999 Klush appeared in the VHI and NBC mini series "Shake Rattle and Roll" as Elvis. In 2013 Klush appeared on The Late Show with David Letterman at the end of the show as a featured performing musical guest singing the Elvis song 'Suspicious Minds' as part of the promotion of his Las Vegas show, a recreation of the original Elvis Presley performances at the Las Vegas Hilton. In 2016, Klush appeared in an episode of the HBO series Vinyl playing Elvis Presley, in a fictional timeline where Elvis is considering leaving RCA Records.
