= Bo Dietl =

American radio personality and former detective (born 1950)

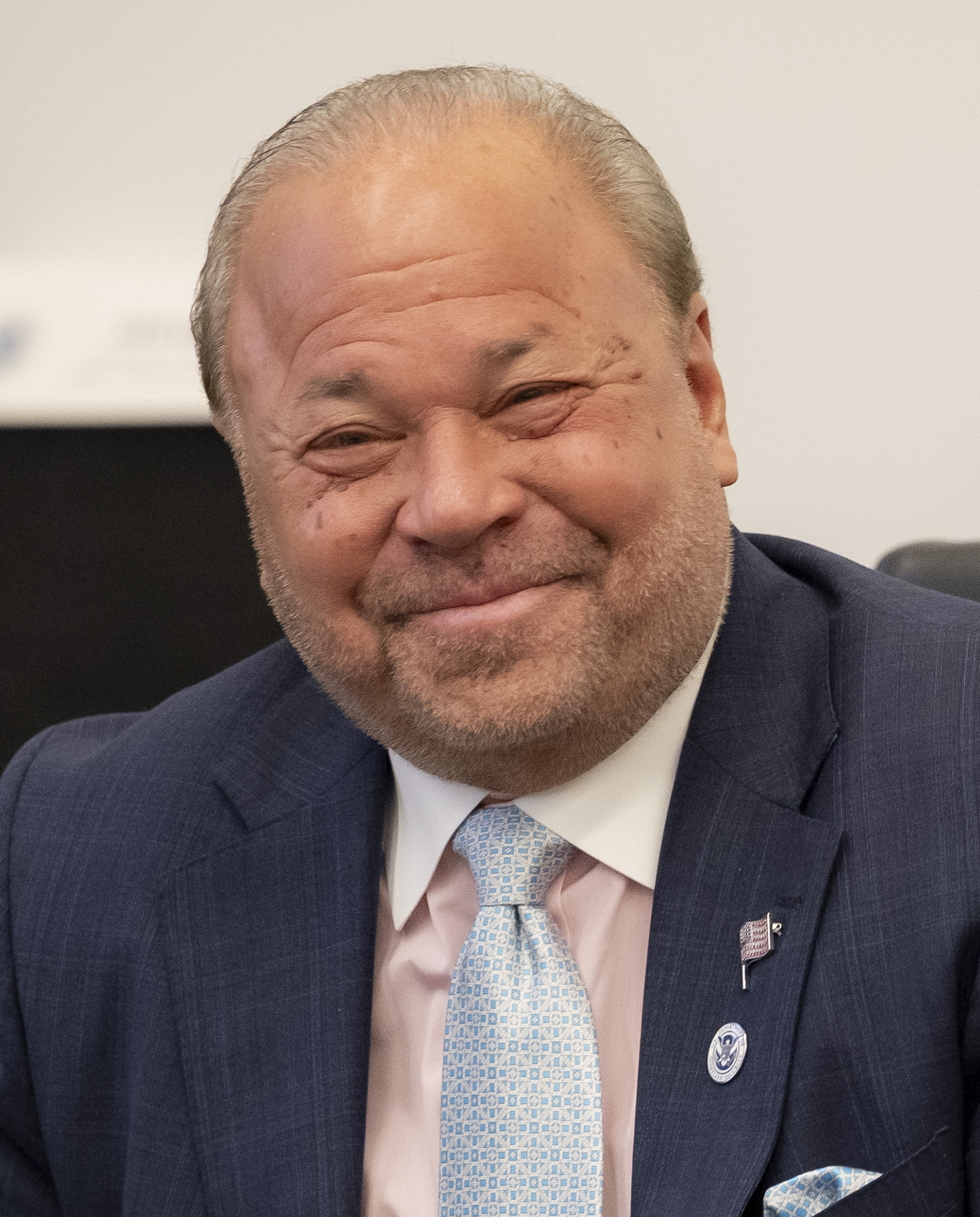
- Dietl in 2025
- Born: December 4, 1950 (age 75); New York City, New York, U.S.
- Occupations: Member, Homeland Security Advisory Council
- Political party: Republican (before 2014); Democratic (2014–2017); Independent (since 2017)
- Police career
- Department: New York City Police Department (NYPD)
- Service years: 1970–1985
- Rank: Detective

Richard A. "Bo" Dietl (born December 4, 1950) is an American media personality, actor, and political appointee. He is a member of President Trump's Homeland Security Advisory Council. He has previously served as an NYPD police detective, and as a private investigator. Dietl has appeared in films, including as himself in The Wolf of Wall Street, and his autobiography was made into a movie.

== Early life and police career ==
Dietl was born in Queens on December 4, 1950, as the youngest of four siblings. He was raised in Richmond Hill and Ozone Park, Queens. After graduating Richmond Hill High School, he worked as a unionized concrete laborer and iron worker, working on the original World Trade Center. He later joined the New York City Police Department, where he worked for fifteen years. While on the force, he became a high profile detective, making over 1,400 felony arrests, and was awarded 62 medals by the department. He also became a decoy in which he was mugged over 500 times and had 30 line of duty injuries. He retired in 1985.

Dietl also served as head of security for Jordan Belfort during the 1990s.

He is the founder and CEO of Beau Dietl & Associates and Beau Dietl Consulting Services.

== Film, television, and radio ==
In 1998, Dietl's autobiography One Tough Cop: The Bo Dietl Story was made into the film One Tough Cop starring Stephen Baldwin as Bo Dietl. The plot in Abel Ferrara's crime drama Bad Lieutenant is mainly inspired by Dietl's 1981 investigation of the rape of a young nun.

Dietl has appeared in three Martin Scorsese films: as the detective who arrests Henry Hill in Goodfellas (1990), as himself in The Wolf of Wall Street (2013), and as labor leader and mob boss Joseph Glimco in The Irishman (2019).

An interview with Dietl is included in the documentary Fabled Enemies by Jason Bermas of Loose Change fame. Dietl speaks about his relationship with FBI agent John P. O'Neill who was the leading expert on Osama bin Laden until his resignation from the FBI in August 2001 to become head of security at the World Trade Center, where he was killed in the September 11 attacks.

Dietl was an associate producer for The Bone Collector and producer for the movie Table One.

Dietl was a weekly guest of Don Imus on the Imus in the Morning radio program on WABC radio. Until 2017, he used to appear regularly on Fox News Channel shows, including Hannity and Geraldo at Large. He had also appeared on The Daily Show with Jon Stewart, The O'Reilly Factor, and had a guest role on the NBC crime drama Law & Order.

Dietl is currently the host of One Tough Podcast.

== Work as a private investigator ==
Dietl has worked as a private investigator on behalf of numerous high-profile conservative personalities, including Steve Bannon, Sean Hannity, Don Imus.

1997, Dietl was hired by Steve Bannon during his divorce from his second wife to investigate her accusations of domestic violence against Bannon. He reportedly continued to work for Bannon after his divorce from his wife and reportedly talked with Bannon "hundreds of times over the years".

On May 4, 2017, The Wall Street Journal reported that Dietl said he was hired by Fox News network management to discredit the harassment claims by former anchor Gretchen Carlson and former producer Andrea Mackris against Roger Ailes and Bill O'Reilly. After this was reported, Dietl ceased to be a contributor to Fox News.

== Politics ==
Dietl was the Republican and Conservative nominee for the 6th Congressional District in 1986.

In 1994, Governor George Pataki appointed Dietl chairman of the New York State Security Guard Advisory Council.

He served as security consultant to the Republican National Convention and as director of security for the New York State Republican Convention.

On December 6, 2010, Dietl joined Fox News contributors Joel Mowbray and Bob Beckel in calling for the assassination of Julian Assange.

In 2014, Dietl announced his intention to run for Mayor of New York City in 2017, initially intending to run in the Democratic primary against incumbent Mayor Bill de Blasio. In February 2017, Dietl announced he would no longer be challenging de Blasio in the primaries, running instead as an independent, due to a paperwork filing error. He received approximately 1% of the total vote, finishing in sixth place.

On April 17, 2025, President Donald Trump appointed Dietl as a member of the Homeland Security Advisory Council.

== Personal life ==
He is married to Margo Urban, singer of The Cover Girls.

He has a regular Thursday table at Rao's.
