= Ato Essandoh =

American actor (born 1972)

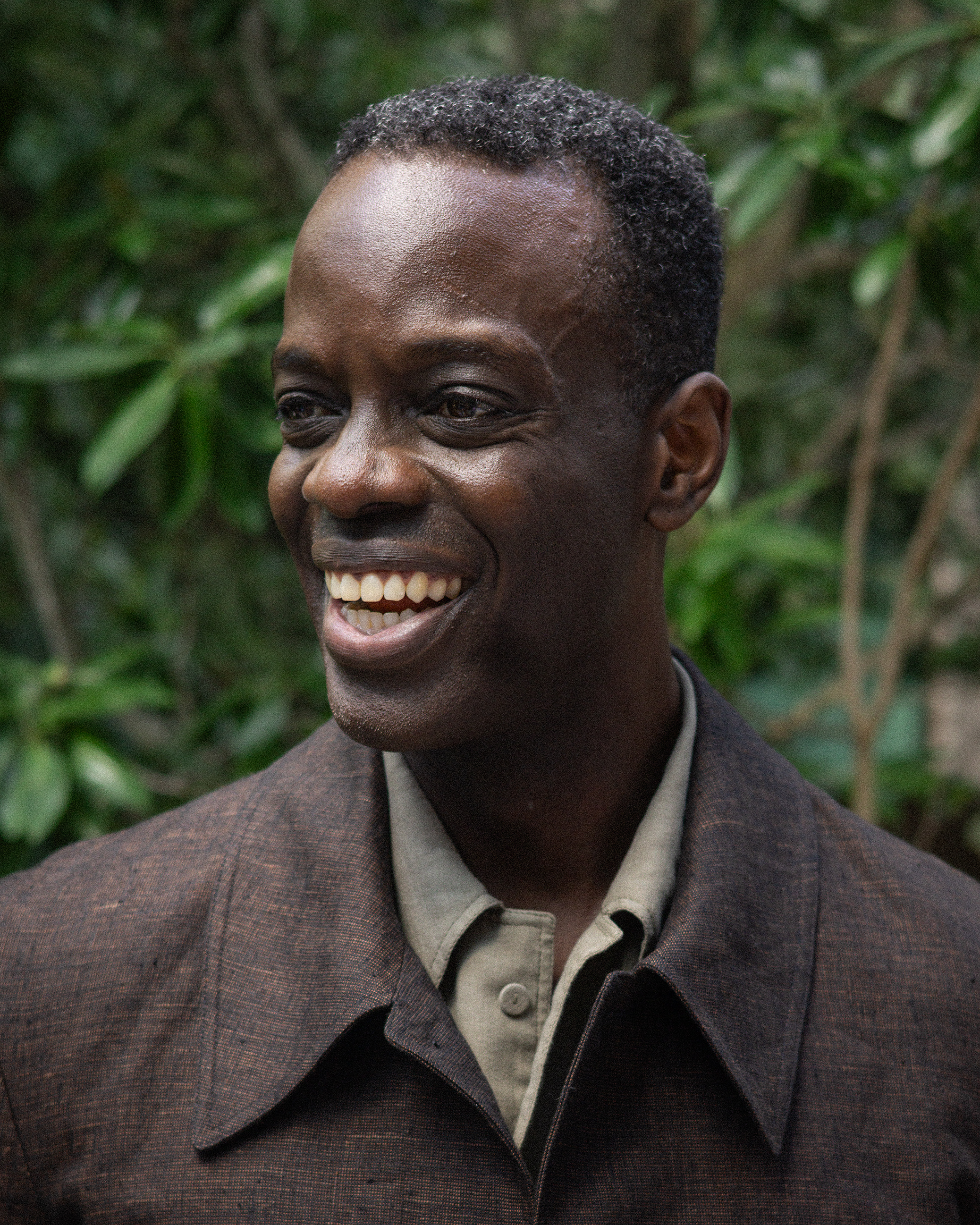
- Essandoh in September 2025
- Born: Ato Essilfi Bracato Essandoh; July 29, 1972 (age 54); Schenectady, New York, U.S.
- Education: Cornell University
- Occupation: Actor
- Years active: 2001–present

Ato Essilfi Bracato Essandoh (born July 29, 1972) is an American television and film actor. He has appeared in numerous films and TV series, including a major role in the 2023 Netflix political drama series The Diplomat.

== Early life and education ==
Ato Essilfi Bracato Essandoh was born in Schenectady, New York, on July 29, 1972, the eldest child of Ebow and Monica Essandoh, from Ghana.

He graduated from New Rochelle High School in 1990. He received a B.S. in chemical engineering from Cornell University. He first joined theater when he was dared to do so by a girlfriend.

He studied acting under James Price at The Acting Studio - New York in New York City.

== Career ==
In 2020 Essandoh launched a podcast, Unrelated, together with childhood friend Chris Cecot, in which they discuss how race and color shaped their experiences growing up. In the same year, he played an African-British-Jewish astronaut in the 2020 Netflix scifi drama series Away.

For his recurring role as Orthodox Jewish cardiothoracic surgeon Dr. Isidore Latham in Chicago Med, Essandoh learned Hebrew prayers and how to put on tefillin, and studied Jewish law

== Filmography ==
=== Film ===
Year	Title	Role	Notes
2001	The Experience Box	Daniel	
2001	The Accident	Cassius	Short
2002	Roger Dodger	Bouncer	
2004	Garden State	Titembay	
2004	Salome	King Herod	Short
2004	Saving Face	Jay, The Neighbor	
2005	Hitch	Tanis	
2005	Prime	Damien	
2005	Dawn's Early Light	James	Short
2006	Falling for Grace	Jamal	
2006	Brother's Shadow	Soy	
2006	Blood Diamond	Commander 'Rambo'	
2007	Millennium Crisis	Harkness	
2008	Mia and the Migoo	Baklava (voice)	English dub
2008	Nights in Rodanthe	Jean's Lover	
2010	Get Him to the Greek	Smiling African Drummer	
2010	Camp Hell	Young Priest	
2011	Tu & Eu	Dr. Champagne	Short
2011	Art & Sex	Daniel	
2012	The Discoverers	Winston	
2012	Django Unchained	D'Artagnan	
2013	A Life for a Life	Boyle	Short
2014	Wish I Was Here	Audition Actor #3	
2016	Jason Bourne	Craig Jeffers	
2016	The Vampire Leland	The Monsignor	Short
2017	Frank Embree	Charles Embree (voice)	Short
2018	O.G.	-	
2019	Dark Phoenix	Jones	
2022	Outpost	Earl	
2023	Reptile	Dan Cleary	
2024	Justice League: Crisis on Infinite Earths	Mr. Terrific, Anti-Monitor (voice)	Direct to video

=== Television ===
Year	Title	Role	Notes
2001	Third Watch	Bike Messenger	Episode: "Duty"
2003	Chappelle's Show	Extra	Episode: "Mad Real World & Ask A Gay Dude"
2003	Law & Order	Jason Hendri	Episode: "Suicide Box"
2003	Line of Fire	Archibald 'Crazy Jazz' Lincoln	Episode: "Pilot"
2005	Commander in Chief	Manute Obama	Episode: "Pilot"
2006	Conviction	Byron 'B-Fly' Williams	Episode: "Indebted"
2007	Law & Order	Andre Blair	Episode: "Bling"
2009	Royal Pains	Antoine	Episode: "If I Were a Sick Man"
2010	Law & Order: Criminal Intent	Hassan	Episode: "Loyalty: Part 1 & 2"
2011	White Collar	Frederik Bilal	Episode: "Burke's Seven"
2011	Damages	Bomb Tech	Recurring role
2011–2012	Treme	-	2 episodes
2011–2016	Blue Bloods	Reverend Darnell Potter	Recurring role (seasons 2–7)
2012–2013	Copper	Matthew Freeman	Main role
2012–2018	Elementary	Alfredo Llamosa	Recurring role (seasons 1 & 3); Guest role (seasons 2, 4 & 6)
2013	The Good Wife	Dr. Elliot Chesterfield	Episode: "Je Ne Sais What?"
2014	Believe	FBI Agent Gardner	Recurring role
2014	Madam Secretary	King Nungunde	Episode: "Pilot"
2015	Girls	D. August	Recurring role
2015	Person of Interest	Ray Pratt	Episode: "Skip"
2016	Vinyl	Lester Grimes	Main role
2016–2021	Chicago Med	Dr. Isidore Latham	Recurring role (seasons 2–5); Guest role (season 6)
2018	Wolverine: The Long Night	Agent Tad Marshall	Main role
2018–2020	Altered Carbon	Vernon Elliot	Main role (season 1); Guest role (season 2)
2019	The Code	Major Trey Ferry	Main role
2020	Tales from the Loop	Gaddis	Recurring role
2020	Away	Kwesi Weisberg Annan	Main role
2021	Evil	Nathan Katsaris	Episode: "D Is for Doll"
2021–2024	Agent Stoker	EnGAGE	Recurring role
2022	Let the Right One In	Frank	3 episodes
2023	Extrapolations	Marco	Episode: "2046: Whale Fall"
2023–present	The Diplomat	Stuart Hayford	Main role
2026	R.J. Decker	Augustine	Episode: "Arms and Armadillos"

=== Video games ===
Year	Title	Role	Notes
2011	Saints Row: The Third	Radio Voices (voice)	
