= Ephraim Sykes =

American actor and singer (born 1985)

- Born: July 17, 1985 (age 41); St. Petersburg, Florida, United States
- Education: Fordham University
- Occupation: Dancer · choreographer · actor · singer · musician
- Known for: Hamilton; Ain't Too Proud; Our Town
- Relatives: Martina Sykes (sister)

Ephraim Manessah Sykes (born July 17, 1985) is an American actor and singer. Sykes played the role of George Eacker in the original Broadway cast of the musical Hamilton. In 2017, Sykes originated and was nominated for a Tony Award for the role of David Ruffin in the musical Ain't Too Proud, a stage musical based on the life of The Temptations. In 2024, he starred as George Gibbs in the Broadway revival of the American classic Our Town.

In December 2016, he played Seaweed J. Stubbs in NBC's live production of Hairspray Live!.

== Filmography ==
- 30 Rock (2006)
- The Kennedy Center Honors (2010, 2011, 2013)
- Leave It on the Floor (2011)
- Smash (2013)
- Vinyl (2016) – Marvin
- Hairspray Live! (2016) – Seaweed J. Stubbs
- Crisis in Six Scenes (2016)
- Detroit (2017) - Jimmy
- Hamilton (2020) - George Eacker
- Russian Doll (2022) - Derek, 3 episodes
- Moon Girl and Devil Dinosaur (2024) - Bobby the Myth, episode: "Wish-Tar"

== Theatre ==
Year	Title	Role	Theater
2009	The Little Mermaid	Ensemble	Lunt-Fontanne Theatre, Broadway
2009	The Wiz	Ensemble u/s Scarecrow	New York City Center, Off-Broadway
2009–2010	Memphis	Ensemble / Be Black Trio u/s Gator	Shubert Theatre, Broadway
2011	Bring It On: The Musical	Ensemble	Alliance Theatre
2011	Memphis	Ensemble / Be Black Trio u/s Gator	Shubert Theatre, Broadway
2011-2012	Rent	Benjamin Coffin III	New World Stages, Off-Broadway
2012	Newsies	Mush / Ensemble	Nederlander Theatre, Broadway
2013-2014	Motown: The Musical	Temptation / Robert Gordy / Contour / Jackson 5	Lunt-Fontanne Theatre, Broadway
2015	Hamilton	George Eacker / Ensemble u/s Hercules Mulligan / James Madison	The Public Theater, Off-Broadway
2015-2016	Hamilton	George Eacker / Ensemble u/s Hercules Mulligan / James Madison	Richard Rodgers Theatre, Broadway
2017	Ain't Too Proud	David Ruffin	Berkeley Repertory Theatre
2018	Ain't Too Proud	David Ruffin	Kennedy Center
2018	Ain't Too Proud	David Ruffin	Ahmanson Theatre
2018	Ain't Too Proud	David Ruffin	Princess of Wales Theatre
2019-2020	Ain't Too Proud	David Ruffin	Imperial Theatre, Broadway
2023	Pal Joey	Joey Evans	New York City Center, Off-Broadway
2024	Bye Bye Birdie	Conrad Birdie	Kennedy Center
2024-2025	Our Town	George Gibbs	Ethel Barrymore Theatre, Broadway
2025	Guys and Dolls	Sky Masterson	Ogunquit Playhouse
2025	Hello, Dolly!	Cornelius Hackl	Carnegie Hall
2026	The Fear of 13	Man 4 / Wesley	James Earl Jones Theatre, Broadway

== Awards and nominations ==
Year	Award	Category	Work	Result
2010	Astaire Awards	Outstanding Male Dancer in a Broadway Show	Memphis	Nominated
2012	Astaire Awards	Outstanding Male Dancer in a Broadway Show	Newsies	Nominated
2016	Astaire Awards	Outstanding Ensemble in a Broadway Show	Hamilton	Nominated
2019	Chita Rivera Award	Outstanding Male Dancer in a Broadway Show	Ain't Too Proud	Won
2019	Broadway.com Audience Awards	Favorite Breakthrough Performance (Male)	Ain't Too Proud	Won
2019	Drama League Award	Distinguished Performance	Ain't Too Proud	Nominated
2019	Tony Award	Best Featured Actor in a Musical	Ain't Too Proud	Nominated
2020	Grammy Award	Best Musical Theater Album	Ain't Too Proud	Nominated
2025	Drama League Award	Distinguished Performance	Our Town	Nominated
