= Susan Heyward =

American actress

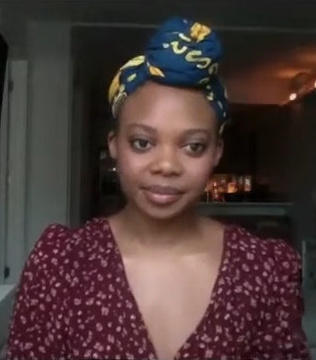
- Heyward in 2020
- Born: Atlanta, Georgia, U.S.
- Education: Carnegie Mellon University (BFA)
- Occupation: Actress
- Years active: 2006–present

Susan Heyward is an American actress who appeared as Sister Sage in the superhero series’s The Boys (2024-2026) and Gen V (2025). She starred in the PlayStation Network original series Powers (2015–16) and HBO period drama Vinyl (2016). From 2018 to 2019, Heyward had a recurring role as Tamika Ward in the Netflix comedy-drama series Orange Is the New Black.

On stage, Heyward made her Broadway debut in the 2013 production of The Trip to Bountiful and in 2018–2019 she played Rose Granger-Weasley in the Broadway production of Harry Potter and the Cursed Child.

== Early life and education ==
Heyward was born and raised in Atlanta, Georgia, United States, and graduated with a BFA degree from Carnegie Mellon University.

== Career ==
She began her career appearing in off-Broadway productions and guest-starring roles on television series, including Law & Order and 30 Rock. In 2009, she was regular cast member in the short-lived Comedy Central comedy series Michael & Michael Have Issues. In 2014, she had a recurring role in the Fox thriller series The Following. In 2013, she made her Broadway debut appearing opposite Cicely Tyson in The Trip to Bountiful. Among Heyward's off-Broadway credits are the title role in Sabrina Fair and The Purple Lights of Joppa Illinois. Her film credits include Mother of George (2013), starring Danai Gurira, Poltergeist (2015), The Incredible Jessica James (2017) and The Light of the Moon (2017).

In 2015, Heyward was cast in the leading role alongside Sharlto Copley and Eddie Izzard in the PlayStation Network's first scripted original series, Powers. The series was canceled after two seasons. In 2016, she co-starred in the HBO period drama series, Vinyl playing the role of personal secretary to Bobby Cannavale's lead character. From 2018 to 2019, Heyward played the role of Tamika Ward, the new Warden in Litchfield prison in the Netflix comedy-drama series Orange Is the New Black. In 2018, Heyward was cast as Rose Granger-Weasley in the Broadway production of Harry Potter and the Cursed Child.

== Filmography ==
=== Film ===
Year	Title	Role	Notes
2006	Sofia for Now	Church Attendee	
2012	Busted on Brigham Lane	Momo	Short film
2013	Mother of George	Monica	
2015	Poltergeist	Sophie	
2017	The Incredible Jessica James	Jerusa	
2017	The Light of the Moon	Grace	
2018	Radium Girls	Etta	

=== Television ===
Year	Title	Role	Notes
2009	Michael & Michael Have Issues	Lindsey	4 episodes
2009	Law & Order	Alicia Rodriguez	Episode: "Shotgun"
2010	30 Rock	Feyonce	Episode: "I Do Do"
2012	666 Park Avenue	Janet	2 episodes
2014	The Following	Hannah	Recurring role
2015	Powers	Deena Pilgrim	Main role
2016	Unforgettable	Rhonda Matthews	Episode: "Game On"
2016	Vinyl	Cece Matthews	Recurring role
2016	Conviction	Porscha Williams	Episode: "#StayWoke"
2018–2019	Orange Is the New Black	Tamika Ward	Recurring role
2020	Tommy	Keaton	Episode: "Lifetime Achievement"
2021	Delilah	Demetria Barnes	Series regular
2023	Hello Tomorrow!	Betty Porter	Recurring role
2024–2026	The Boys	Sister Sage / Jessica Bradley	Main role (seasons 4–5); 16 episodes
2025	Gen V	Sister Sage / Jessica Bradley	2 episodes

=== Stage ===
Year	Title	Role	Notes
2008	The Oedipus Cycle	Ismene	
2010	Sabrina Fair	Sabrina	
2013	The Trip to Bountiful	Thelma	Apr 23, 2013 – Oct 09, 2013
2016	The Purple Lights of Joppa Illinois	Monique	
2018–2019	Harry Potter and the Cursed Child	Rose Granger-Weasley	Mar 16, 2018 – Mar 17, 2019
