= MacKenzie Meehan =

American actress

- Education: California State University, Long Beach (BA); New York University (MFA)
- Occupation: Actress
- Years active: 2011–present
- Children: 1
- Website: mackenziemeehan.com

MacKenzie Meehan is an American actress, known for The Wolf of Wall Street (2013), These Hopeless Savages (2014) and Couch Hoppers (2013). She was nominated for the Helen Hayes Awards for Outstanding Supporting Actress, Resident Play in 2011. She is an acting member of The Actors Company Theatre.

Meehan received her bachelor's degree from California State University and her MFA in acting from New York University.

== Filmography ==
=== Films ===
Title	Year	Role	Notes	Ref(s)
The Wolf of Wall Street	2013	Hildy Azoff		
The Fold	2013	Dell		
These Hopeless Savages	2014	Nicki		
My All American	2015	Nurse Fuller	Linda Wheeler, played by Sarah Bolger in this movie, is Mackenzie's mother.	
A Stand Up Guy	2016	Lorie		

=== Television and short ===
Title	Year	Role	Notes	Ref(s)
Couch Hoppers	-	Mac	Short	
Candlesticks	2011	Hannah Miller	Short	
White Collar	2011	Event Attendant	TV series	
Mildred Pierce	2011	Cashier	TV miniseries	
Vinyl	2016	Penny		
Bull	2018–2022	Taylor Rentzel	Series regular, season 3–6	
Adult Ed.	2019	Rita McKee	TV series	

== Award and nominations ==
- Helen Hayes Award 2011 - Outstanding Supporting Actress (Resident Play)
