= Emily Tremaine =

American actress

- Born: Rochester, Minnesota
- Education: Sarah Lawrence College
- Occupation: Actress
- Years active: 2007–present
- Spouse: Shiloh Fernandez
- Children: 1

Emily Tremaine is an American actress, best known for playing Audrey Bidwell, Donald Ressler's (Diego Klattenhoff) former fiancée on NBC's The Blacklist and Natalie Atwood on Freeform's Guilt.

== Career ==
In 2016, Tremaine was recurring on HBOs Vinyl as Heather, receptionist of American Century. Later, she played Natalie Atwood, a main role on Freeform's series Guilt. In 2018, Tremaine guested on Bull in the episode "Bad Medicine" as Laura Anthony.

== Filmography ==
=== Film ===
Year	Title	Role	Notes
2010	Multiple Sarcasms	Receptionist	
2010	Monogamy	Redhead	
2010	Shadows & Lies	Cindy	
2010	Mercy	Resident Sabrina	
2010	The Best and the Brightest	Mica	
2011	Cogitat Ergo Sum	Carol	Short film
2013	The Wolf of Wall Street	Cristy	
2014	Obvious Child	Lacey	
2015	Experimenter	Shelia Jarcho	
2015	This Is Happening	Ashley	
2015	Self/less	Mallory	
2015	Collar	Peggy Williams	
2016	Frontman	Lydia Fry	Short film
2019	The Way You Look Tonight	Heloise	
2019	Otherhood	Lauren Lieberman	
2020	Slow Machine	The Realtor	
2021	The Birthday Cake	Karen	
2021	The Starling	Alice	
2023	Mob Land	Casey	

=== Television ===
Year	Title	Role	Notes
2007	The Bronx Is Burning	Dorris	Miniseries; Episode: "The Seven Commandments"
2008	As the World Turns	Fan at Metro	1 episode
2010	The Good Wife	Kirsten	Episode: "Hi"
2011	Lights Out	Melissa	Episode: "The Shot"
2011	One Life to Live	Kriss Kall	1 episode
2011	Person of Interest	Snooty Salesgirl	Episode: "Masquerade"
2012	Firelight	Amy Scott	Television film
2012	Hunting Season	Hostess	1 episode
2013	Deception	Mary Preswick	Episode: "Good Luck with Your Death"
2013	The Big C	Dina	2 episodes
2013–14	The Blacklist	Audrey Bidwell	3 episodes
2015	Royal Pains	Becki	2 episodes
2016	Vinyl	Heather	10 episodes
2016	Guilt	Natalie Atwood	Main role; 10 episodes
2018	Bull	Laura Anthony	Episode: "Bad Medicine"
2021	Mr. Corman	Lindsey	2 episodes
