= Ira Newborn =

American actor

- Born: James Ira Newborn; December 26, 1949 (age 76); New York City, U.S.
- Occupations: Composer, orchestrator, conductor, actor
- Musical career
- Genre: Film score
- Years active: 1975–2019

James Ira Newborn (born December 26, 1949) is an American musician, actor, orchestrator and composer, best known for his work composing motion picture soundtracks.

== Life and career ==
Newborn was born in New York City. He has scored or written songs for films such as Sixteen Candles, Weird Science, Ferris Bueller's Day Off, Uncle Buck, Planes, Trains and Automobiles, Mallrats, Ace Ventura: Pet Detective and Into the Night, for which he wrote music for B. B. King. He frequently worked with director John Hughes. He also stepped in as musical director and producer for The Blues Brothers. Newborn's many film credits also include a small acting role in Xanadu, in which he appears as a 1940s bandleader.

Newborn may be best known for composing the soundtrack for The Naked Gun series of police satires starring Leslie Nielsen. Newborn's brassy big band/blues theme song for the franchise first appeared on the TV series that inspired the films, 1982's Police Squad!.

Newborn has also worked in concerts and commercials, on Broadway and in the recording industry as a performer, arranger, composer and conductor.

He is also an adjunct faculty member at New York University, from which he received his bachelor's degree in 1972. Influenced by an eclectic variety of composers, such as Johann Sebastian Bach, James Brown and the Beatles, as a guitarist Newborn led and played in several musical groups before signing on as the musical director for the vocal group the Manhattan Transfer.

Newborn has contributed to albums by many artists such as Ray Charles, Diana Ross, Billy Joel and the Pointer Sisters.

=== As a songwriter ===
Newborn wrote two songs performed by B.B. King for the Into the Night soundtrack: "My Lucille" and "Into the Night." Two songs co-written by Newborn appeared on the Into the Night soundtrack album, but not in the film: "Don't Make Me Sorry," co-written by Joe Esposito and performed by Patti LaBelle, and "Keep It Light," co-written by Reginald "Sonny" Burke and performed by Thelma Houston.

Newborn co-wrote "Clap Your Hands" for the Manhattan Transfer and "Get It On and Have a Party" for Pattie Brooks on the Doctor Detroit soundtrack. Both "Geek Boogie" from Sixteen Candles and "Weird Romance" from Weird Science were credited to Ira and the Geeks.

He co-wrote "I Guess I'm Just Screwed" for The Naked Gun 2½: The Smell of Fear with David Zucker and Robert LoCash. With Peter Segal, he co-wrote "The Food Song" for the Naked Gun 33 1/3: The Final Insult soundtrack.

== Filmography ==
=== Film ===
| Year | Title | Director(s) | Studio(s) | Notes |
|---|---|---|---|---|
| 1980 | The Blues Brothers | John Landis | Universal Pictures | Conductor only |
| 1981 | All Night Long | Jean-Claude Tramont | Universal Pictures | with Richard Hazard and José Padilla |
| 1983 | Doctor Detroit | Michael Pressman | Universal Pictures | soundtrack produced with Robert K Weiss inc song writing credits for James Brown, Pattie Brooks and Dan Aykroyd |
| 1984 | Sixteen Candles | John Hughes | Universal Pictures | with Molly Ringwald and Anthony Michael Hall |
| 1985 | Into the Night | John Landis | Universal Pictures | —N/a |
| 1985 | Weird Science | John Hughes | Universal Pictures | —N/a |
| 1986 | Wise Guys | Brian De Palma | Metro-Goldwyn-Mayer | —N/a |
| 1986 | Ferris Bueller's Day Off | John Hughes | Paramount Pictures | —N/a |
| 1987 | Dragnet | Tom Mankiewicz | Universal Pictures | —N/a |
| 1987 | Amazon Women on the Moon | Joe Dante; Carl Gottlieb; Peter Horton; John Landis; Robert K. Weiss | Universal Pictures | —N/a |
| 1987 | Planes, Trains and Automobiles | John Hughes | Paramount Pictures | with Steve Martin and John Candy |
| 1988 | Caddyshack II | Allan Arkush | Warner Bros. | with Jackie Mason and Robert Stack |
| 1988 | The Naked Gun: From the Files of Police Squad! | David Zucker | Paramount Pictures | —N/a |
| 1989 | Collision Course | Lewis Teague | De Laurentiis Entertainment Group | with Jay Leno and Pat Morita |
| 1989 | Uncle Buck | John Hughes | Universal Pictures | with John Candy and Macaulay Culkin |
| 1990 | Short Time | Gregg Champion | 20th Century Fox; Gladden Entertainment | with Dabney Coleman and Matt Frewer |
| 1990 | My Blue Heaven | Herbert Ross | Warner Bros. | —N/a |
| 1991 | The Naked Gun 2½: The Smell of Fear | David Zucker | Paramount Pictures | —N/a |
| 1992 | The Opposite Sex and How to Live with Them | Matthew Meshekoff | Miramax | —N/a |
| 1992 | Brain Donors | Dennis Dugan | Paramount Pictures | —N/a |
| 1992 | Innocent Blood | John Landis | Warner Bros. | —N/a |
| 1994 | Ace Ventura: Pet Detective | Tom Shadyac | Warner Bros. Morgan Creek Productions | —N/a |
| 1994 | Naked Gun 33 1/3: The Final Insult | Peter Segal | Paramount Pictures | —N/a |
| 1995 | The Jerky Boys: The Movie | James Melkonian | Touchstone Pictures | —N/a |
| 1995 | Mallrats | Kevin Smith | Gramercy Pictures | —N/a |
| 1996 | High School High | Hart Bochner | TriStar Pictures | —N/a |
| 1997 | Bad Manners | Jonathan Kaufer | Phaedra Cinema | —N/a |
| 1998 | BASEketball | David Zucker | Universal Pictures | Credited as James Ira Newborn |

=== Television ===
- SCTV (1981) (TV)
- Police Squad! (1982) (TV)
- Tales from the Crypt (1992) (TV)
- The Late Shift (1996) (TV)
