= St. Clare Entertainment =

American television production company

- Industry: Television production
- Owners: John Landis; Robert K. Weiss; Leslie Belzberg

St. Clare Entertainment is a television production company owned by John Landis, Robert K. Weiss, and Leslie Belzberg. The company was responsible for such television series as Sliders, Weird Science, Honey, I Shrunk the Kids: The TV Show, Campus Cops, Dream On, and Sir Arthur Conan Doyle's The Lost World.

The company takes its name from Clare of Assisi, the patron saint of television. Their logo consists of a drawing of three wise monkeys ("See no evil, hear no evil, speak no evil") sitting in the center of the screen.

The company was at one time, affiliated with MCA TV, via the Universal Television unit. In 1995, after 15 years at the Universal lot, St. Clare Entertainment was moved to Walt Disney Television, with the intent to develop new television projects. On November 11, 1997, St. Clare started working on The Lost World through DirecTV's Action Adventure Network alliance. On January 10, 1999, it inked into a partnership with Canadian TV producer Telescene to develop The Lost World to television under Action Adventure Network, for New Line Television, who served as US distributor and Fremantle Corporation, who served as international distributor.
