= Jonathan Kaufer =

American film director (1955–2013)

- Born: Jonathan David Kaufer; March 14, 1955; Los Angeles, California, U.S.
- Died: October 2, 2013 (aged 58); Las Vegas, Nevada, U.S.
- Occupations: Film director, actor, screenwriter
- Years active: 1976–1997
- Spouse: Pia Zadora (m. 1995; div. 2001)
- Children: 1

Jonathan David Kaufer (March 14, 1955 – October 2, 2013) was an American film director, screenwriter, and occasional actor. Kaufer received his first job while in his late teens as a writer for the sitcom Mork & Mindy. Filmmaker Howard Zieff later hired Kaufer to do rewrites for his films, and his work on the 1979 film The Main Event led to a development deal enabling him to direct his first film, the romantic comedy Soup for One. At the time, he was the youngest director hired by a major studio.

Kaufer did not make another film for seventeen years, however, he had acting roles in two films and wrote and directed an episode of the television series Dream On. In 1997, his second and final film, Bad Manners, was released. The film, based on a play by David Gilman, received positive reviews, holding an 84% approval rating on the website Rotten Tomatoes.

Kaufer dated model and actress Myra Jean Hall. When he learned that she had been in a relationship with another man, he attacked her and was jailed for attempted murder. He was married to actress Pia Zadora from August 1995 to November 2001, and the two had one son together. In 2010, Kaufer sued Zadora, due to claims that Zadora had made which Kaufer alleged were defamation; however, the case was thrown out. Kaufer died on October 2, 2013, when he was ejected from a vehicle while driving from Las Vegas to Los Angeles.

== Early life and career ==
Jonathan David Kaufer was born on March 14, 1955, in Los Angeles. His father was Mac and his mother was Jimi. His brother Scott is a television writer and producer, and he also had a sister, Susan. Kaufer first attended Sarah Lawrence College. While there, Kaufer received his first job as a writer when he was hired to write for the sitcom Mork & Mindy. Kaufer also attended Amherst College. While there, he penned comedy screenplays for television. Although his agents advised him to continue attending the school, Kaufer ignored them and was hired as story editor for the short-lived science fiction series Quark.

Filmmaker Howard Zieff discovered Kaufer, which led to Kaufer doing rewrites on the script for Zieff's films The Main Event and Unfaithfully Yours. Kaufer's work on The Main Event gave him a development deal with Warner Bros., which led to his directing the comedy Soup for One. At 24 years old and recently out of college, the film made Kaufer the youngest filmmaker to be hired by a major studio at the time. Kaufer, who also wrote the film's screenplay, was compared to Woody Allen for his work. TV Guide wrote that Kaufer "lacks distance or objectivity" but that he "brings a rare type of energy to the film," and Vincent Canby wrote that "it's energetic, sort of gawky, sometimes obnoxious, occasionally very funny and frequently endearing" and described Kaufer and the cast as "up-and-coming new talents." Kaufer did not direct another film for sixteen years, with The Sacramento Bee noting he had "disappeared".

Kaufer had brief acting roles in the years between making his two films, appearing in the Henry Jaglom film Always... But Not Forever and the John Landis-directed Into the Night. He also wrote and directed "Martin Gets Lucky", an episode of the television series Dream On. It originally aired on August 26, 1990, the eighth episode of the first season. Kaufer also wrote several romantic comedies that he was willing to direct, however, he recalled that "the studios kept folding when I turned in my scripts!"

He made a return to directing with the 1997 film Bad Manners. The film, which stars David Strathairn, Bonnie Bedelia, Saul Rubinek, Caroleen Feeney and Julie Harris, was based on the play Ghost in the Machine by David Gilman, who also wrote the screenplay. Reviews for the film were generally positive. Rotten Tomatoes reported that, based on 13 reviews, 85% of critics gave the film a favorable review.

== Personal life ==
Kaufer was married to American actress Pia Zadora from August 1995 to November 2001; they had one son. Zadora claimed they separated after Kaufer allegedly threw her against a garage door. Kaufer denied that he had ever done so, claiming that the "brief and mutual physical contact" occurred when Zadora was intoxicated and had attempted to take their son out of a moving vehicle. He also rebuffed a claim that he had attacked Zadora on a ferry, claiming that "Pia fell that evening because she was drunk." In 2010, he filed a lawsuit, claiming that Zadora defamed him. Kaufer accused Zadora of taking advantage of their son's developmental issues in order to make "false, outrageous and defamatory reports." The complaint wrote that Zadora alleged Kaufer had downloaded child pornography onto his computer and that he had molested his son. Zadora won dismissal of the lawsuit, with its being ruled that her statements fell under protected speech.

In 1985, Kaufer was arrested for attempted murder after attacking his then-girlfriend, actress and model Myra Jean Hall, in her apartment. Kaufer, angry that Hall had dated another man, reportedly used a leather rope to choke her. Hall managed to break free and phoned authorities. Kaufer was later released on bond.

== Death ==
Kaufer fell asleep at the wheel and died in a road accident on October 2, 2013. He had been on his way from Las Vegas to Los Angeles. Driving on Interstate 15, Kaufer was traveling southbound when his car swerved to the right into a dirt median. The vehicle then tilted back into the roadway before swerving back, rolling and ejecting Kaufer from the car. He was pronounced dead on scene.

== Filmography ==
=== Film ===
Year	Title	Role	Ref.
1982	Soup for One	Director; Writer	
1985	Into the Night	Actor: Kalijak Script Clerk	
1985	Always... But Not Forever	Actor: Maxwell	
1997	Bad Manners	Director	

=== Television ===
Year	Title	Role	Notes	Ref.
1976–1977	Holmes & Yo-Yo	Writer	"The Thornhill Affair" "Bye, Bye Bennie"	
1978	Quark	Story editor		
1990	Dream On	Director; Writer	"Martin Gets Lucky"	
