= B.B. King: Into the Night =

1985 film

- Directed by: John Landis; Jeffrey A. Okun
- Produced by: Dan Allingham; Leslie Belzberg; George Folsey Jr. John Landis
- Starring: B.B. King; John Landis; Ira Newborn; Domingo Ambriz
- Cinematography: Daniel Pearl
- Edited by: Malcolm Campbell; Bruce Ochmanek
- Release date: 1985
- Running time: 27 minutes
- Country: United States
- Language: English

B.B. King: Into the Night is a 1985 documentary film directed by Jeff A. Okun and co-directed by John Landis for Universal Pictures; it was produced by Leslie Belzberg, John Landis and George Folsey Jr.

== Synopsis ==
Landis directed the parts of the film that are the music videos for B.B. King's songs "Lucille", "Into the Night" (specially composed by Ira Newborn for the film Into the Night) and also for the song "In the Midnight Hour". Videos for "Lucille" and "In the Midnight Hour" are similar and show B.B. King and his band (Jeff Goldblum, Michelle Pfeiffer, Dan Aykroyd, Eddie Murphy and Steve Martin) during a performance in a 1980s nightclub. The video made for "Into the Night" took place in a television studio and shows B.B. King with Jeff Goldblum. Jeff Okun directed the rest of the film (including editing archival King's footage and interviews with Landis and King). The film was made to promote Into the Night and as a tribute to B.B. King's life and art.

== DVD ==
B.B. King: Into the Night appears on the Into the Night movie DVD as a special feature.
