= Weird Science (TV series) =

American television situation comedy

- Genre: Sitcom; Comic science fiction
- Based on: Weird Science by John Hughes "Made of the Future" by Al Feldstein
- Developed by: Tom Spezialy; Alan Cross
- Starring: John Mallory Asher; Michael Manasseri; Vanessa Angel; Lee Tergesen
- Theme music composer: Danny Elfman
- Opening theme: "Weird Science" by Oingo Boingo
- Composer: Peter Bernstein
- Country of origin: United States
- Original language: English
- No. of seasons: 5
- No. of episodes: 88 (list of episodes)

Production
- Executive producers: Leslie Belzberg; John Landis; Robert K. Weiss
- Producers: Adam Barr; Ed Ferrara; Robert Lloyd Lewis; Peter Ocko
- Running time: 30 minutes
- Production companies: St. Clare Entertainment; Universal Television

Original release
- Network: USA Network (1994–1997); Sci-Fi Channel (1998)
- Release: March 5, 1994 – July 25, 1998

Weird Science is an American television sitcom, based on John Hughes' 1985 film of the same title, that aired on the USA Network from March 5, 1994, to April 11, 1997. Six previously unaired, "lost" episodes aired on the Sci-Fi Channel from July 11 to 25, 1998.

== Plot ==
The series follows the adventures of Gary Wallace (John Mallory Asher) and Wyatt Donnelly (Michael Manasseri), two socially inept high-school students in a fictional suburb of Chicago. Together, using Wyatt's computer, they try to create a computer simulation of a perfect woman in order to practice communicating with girls. However, a freak lightning storm brings her to life, creating Lisa (Vanessa Angel), a gorgeous genius with the powers of a "magic genie".

In the pilot episode, Gary claims that creating Lisa is possible because he "saw it in a John Hughes movie", referring to the original Weird Science film.

== Cast ==
- John Mallory Asher replaces Anthony Michael Hall in the role of Gary Wallace. Like his film counterpart, Gary is a poor student and a slacker, always looking for shortcuts to get what he wants (usually to impress girls). Gary is a nice guy and nerdy. Sometimes he is successful with women. His father, Al (Jeff Doucette) is a mechanic and tow-truck driver. His mother Emily is played by Joyce Bulifant, Asher's real life mother.
- Michael Manasseri replaces Ilan Mitchell-Smith in the role of Wyatt Donnelly. Wyatt's wealthy parents are usually out of town, leaving him and his older brother Chett alone in the house. Most stories have him as the more cautious member of the group, more reluctant than Gary to use Lisa's magic. He is more popular with girls than Gary, and several episodes feature Gary being interested in a girl who likes Wyatt instead.
- Vanessa Angel replaces Kelly LeBrock in the role of Lisa. She describes herself as a "magic genie", able to grant the boys' wishes, though she does this out of choice rather than duty and is free to deny them any wish she does not want to grant. Once she grants a wish, Lisa is unable to reverse it, no matter how badly it turns out; however, most of her spells wear off after an indeterminate amount of time. Other than those basic rules, the limits of her powers are never clearly defined, and she seems to get more or less powerful depending on what a particular episode's plot requires. Although she is physically manifested, she is apparently still a program running on Wyatt's computer, and she ceases to appear if the computer is switched off. She is addicted to Chunky Monkey ice cream.
- Lee Tergesen replaces Bill Paxton in the role of Chester "Chett" Donnelly. Chett is a military school graduate who turned down his commission, claiming that he did not want to be sent overseas to work for "Third-World slackers"; he lives with his parents and shows no interest in moving out or getting a job. Paranoid and angry, he takes out his frustrations on Wyatt and Gary, though less sadistically than in the movie; mostly he takes Wyatt's things without asking and calls him names like "wuss-boy" and "pit-lick". He also has a vendetta against Scampi (Bruce Jarchow), principal of the boys' high school. He occasionally has hints of sexual tension with Lisa.

== Production ==
Weird Science was produced by St. Clare Entertainment in association with Universal Television. Premiering on March 1, 1994, the show ran for five seasons on the USA Network for a total of 88 episodes. However, new episodes ceased airing in 1997 with the final six still unaired. They would eventually air in the United States the following year on the Sci-Fi Channel; the show was also rerun briefly on what was then the Fox Family Channel in 2001 and Encore Family in 2004.

The theme song for the series was "Weird Science" by Oingo Boingo, the same as that used in the movie (though they received no on-screen credit for the series).

John Hughes had no involvement with the television version of his film. The creators and showrunners of the series were Tom Spezialy and Alan Cross.

Kari Lizer, one of the staff writers, who later went on to create The New Adventures of Old Christine, said, "Weird Science turned out to be the best job because it made me realize I was more than an actress who could write monologues for herself. It turned me into a real writer because I had to write about things that weren’t close to home."

Seth Green was one of the finalists for the part of Gary. He later had a guest appearance in season 2 episode 1, "Lisa's Virus".

Six episodes that did not air during the series' original run on USA Network eventually aired on Syfy. The first two premiered July 11, 1998, with the remainder premiering as pairs of episodes July 18 and 25, 1998.

== Episodes ==
Season	Episodes	Originally released	
Season	Episodes	First released	Last released
1	13	March 5, 1994	June 4, 1994
2	13	August 6, 1994	November 5, 1994
3	18	April 8, 1995	September 9, 1995
4	26	January 6, 1996	August 10, 1996
5	18	January 5, 1997	July 25, 1998

== International airing ==
In France, the series was aired as Code Lisa on France 2 in 1995, later it was rebroadcast on MCM, NRJ 12 and Game One.

== Home media ==
On January 1, 2008, A&E Home Video released the complete first and second seasons of Weird Science on DVD in Region 1.

The complete series was released on DVD in Australia on August 16, 2017.

DVD name	Ep. no.	Release date
The Complete Seasons 1 & 2	26	January 1, 2008
