= List of Weird Science episodes =

The following is a list of episodes of Weird Science, a 1994-1997 American television sitcom on USA Network, based on the 1985 movie of the same name. Six previously unaired season-five episodes premiered in 1998 on the Sci-Fi Channel.

== Series overview ==
Season	Episodes	Originally released	
Season	Episodes	First released	Last released
1	13	March 5, 1994	June 4, 1994
2	13	August 6, 1994	November 5, 1994
3	18	April 8, 1995	September 9, 1995
4	26	January 6, 1996	August 10, 1996
5	18	January 5, 1997	July 25, 1998

== Episodes ==
=== Season 1 (1994) ===
No. overall	No. in season	Title	Directed by	Written by	Original release date	Prod. code
1	1	"She's Alive"	Max Tash	Alan Cross & Tom Spezialy	March 5, 1994	76101
Gary Wallace and Wyatt Donnelly create a cyber-genie, an attractive young woman called Lisa, with the help of Wyatt's computer and a freak lightning storm. Lisa's magic sends Wyatt's obnoxious elder brother Chett to hell and makes the boy’s crushes attracted to them. When the spells expire, the girls reject the boys, and Chett returns.
2	2	"Universal Remote"	Max Tash	Adam Barr & Peter Ocko	March 12, 1994	76106
Gary wishes for a remote control that he can use to skip past the boring parts of his daily life. However, he becomes stuck in a time loop.
3	3	"Cyrano De Brainiac"	Mark Jean	Story by : Doug Chamberlin & Chris Webb; Teleplay by : Adam Barr & Peter Ocko	March 19, 1994	76102
Gary is attracted to Amy - an intelligent, studious, pretty girl at school. He asks Lisa to give him Albert Einstein's brain. The brain arrives - but in a jar rather than in Gary's skull. The brain speaks with Einstein's voice. Gary brings the brain to school. He thinks that Einstein can help him woo Amy, but his ideas are inapplicable to 1990s America and Amy is not attracted to Gary. Lisa falls in love with Einstein and, when Chett arrives home, she puts the brain in Chett's skull.
4	4	"Magnifico Dad"	Mark Jean	Alan Cross & Tom Spezialy	March 26, 1994	76105
Lisa gives Gary's mother a wish for her birthday, which causes Gary's father to switch bodies with male model Magnifico.
5	5	"The Feminine Mistake"	Max Tash	Story by : Kari Lizer & Eric Alan; Teleplay by : Kari Lizer	April 9, 1994	76110
In order for them to better understand the opposite sex, Lisa turns Gary and Wyatt into women.
6	6	"Airball Kings"	Max Tash	Jeff Vlaming	April 16, 1994	76107
Gary asks Lisa to get him and Wyatt on the school basketball team. Her spell makes the coach their biggest fans, even though they cannot play.
7	7	"Party High, U.S.A."	Mark Jean	Paul Lieberstein	April 23, 1994	76108
Gary wishes that his school classes were relevant to his interests.
8	8	"One Size Fits All"	Mark Jean	Story by : Kari Lizer; Teleplay by : Adam Barr & Peter Ocko	April 30, 1994	76109
Wyatt fancies an athletic girl, and wishes his body muscular to get her attention.
9	9	"Keeps on Tickin'"	Max Tash	Jeff Vlaming	May 7, 1994	76111
Lisa gives the boys watches that count down to Wyatt's death and the loss of Gary's virginity.
10	10	"Mr. President"	Mark Jean	Jeff Vlaming	May 14, 1994	76140
Wyatt wishes to be President of the school chess club, but instead he becomes the President of the United States.
11	11	"Fatal Lisa"	Max Tash	Alan Cross & Tom Spezialy	May 21, 1994	76113
Gary tries to wish Lisa into falling in love with him, but she falls madly in love with Wyatt.
12	12	"Killer Party"	Tom Spezialy	Richard Doctorow	May 28, 1994	76112
Gary throws a party. Lisa makes the boy's parents feel young again.
13	13	"Sex Ed"	Max Tash	Adam Barr & Peter Ocko	June 4, 1994	76114
Lisa becomes the teacher of Gary and Wyatt's sex education class.

=== Season 2 (1994) ===
No. overall	No. in season	Title	Directed by	Written by	Original release date	Prod. code
14	1	"Lisa's Virus"	Max Tash	Kari Lizer	August 6, 1994	76125
Lisa catches a computer virus. While Gary and Wyatt look for the disk, Lisa thinks she is part of a soap opera.
15	2	"The Bazooka Boys"	David Grossman	Eric Alan	August 13, 1994	76127
Lisa makes bubble gum clones of Gary and Wyatt, which plot to take over their lives.
16	3	"The Most Dangerous Wish"	Max Tash	Adam Barr & Peter Ocko	August 20, 1994	76132
To get revenge on the boys for taking her for granted, Lisa brings a video game villain to life.
17	4	"Wyatt Erectus"	David Grossman	Jeff Vlaming	August 27, 1994	76131
In an attempt to make Wyatt more assertive, Lisa gives him a magic cologne. But when he uses too much, he begins turning into a caveman.
18	5	"A Tale of Two Lisas"	Ricardo Méndez Matta	Kari Lizer	September 10, 1994	76128
Lisa splits herself between the two boys to be more like what each of them wants.
19	6	"Nightmare on Chett Street"	David Grossman	Paul Lieberstein	September 17, 1994	76129
Gary uses a dream machine to control Chett for his first day on a new job.
20	7	"Magic for Beginners"	Tom Spezialy	Alan Cross & Tom Spezialy	September 24, 1994	76130
Gary makes a wish to do real magic to win a talent show.
21	8	"Copper Top Girl"	David Grossman	Jeff Vlaming	October 1, 1994	76133
Gary asks Lisa to find a perfect date for Wyatt, but pressed for time, she creates a robotic girl.
22	9	"Switched at Birth"	Ricardo Méndez Matta	Kari Lizer	October 8, 1994	76134
Gary and Wyatt swap places with each other.
23	10	"Camp Wannabe"	David Grossman	Adam Barr & Peter Ocko	October 15, 1994	76135
Gary wishes to go back in time to get a girl and seek revenge. Wyatt finds his teacher and dates her.
24	11	"Circuit Courtship"	Ricardo Méndez Matta	Ed Ferrara & Kevin Murphy	October 22, 1994	76137
Lisa creates a supercomputer, but when he falls for Lisa, the boys are in danger.
25	12	"Chett Reborn"	Steve Dubin	Story by : Paul Lieberstein; Teleplay by : Paul Lieberstein & Kari Lizer & Jeff Vlaming	October 29, 1994	76138
Lisa turns Chett into a baby and Wyatt tries to raise him to be nice.
26	13	"Unplugged"	David Grossman	David Steven Cohen	November 5, 1994	76136
Gary, Wyatt and Lisa become rock stars, but their producer (Ryan Stiles) fires them when they cannot write any good songs after their first hit.

=== Season 3 (1995) ===
No. overall	No. in season	Title	Directed by	Written by	Original release date	Prod. code
27	1	"Earth Boys Are Easy"	Max Tash	Ed Ferrara & Kevin Murphy	April 8, 1995	76206
After Chett breaks up with his girlfriend, Lisa finds him a new woman, who turns out to be an alien who eats her mates.
28	2	"Horseradish"	Troy Miller	Adam Barr & Peter Ocko	April 15, 1995	76202
Gary forgets Lisa's new password, leaving her locked out of the computer without her powers.
29	3	"Grampira"	Max Tash	Kari Lizer	April 22, 1995	76205
Wyatt wishes for his grandmother to spend a day with the energy of a young person, but she gains this energy by sucking it from any young person she touches.
30	4	"Rock Hard Chett"	David Grossman	Ed Ferrara & Kevin Murphy	April 29, 1995	76203
To save Chett from a prank gone wrong, Lisa makes him invulnerable. When he discovers his new powers, he becomes the superhero "The Star-Spangled Butt-Kicker."
31	5	"Lucky Suit"	Max Tash	Kari Lizer	May 6, 1995	76207
Believing that Wyatt's father is successful because of his lucky suit, Gary wishes for his dad to have a lucky suit of his own.
32	6	"Gary Wallace: Boy Reporter"	David Grossman	Jeff Vlaming	May 13, 1995	76204
To impress the beautiful editor of the school paper, Gary uses a magic pen that can make any story come true.
33	7	"Hot Wheels"	Troy Miller	Adam Barr & Peter Ocko	May 27, 1995	76208
Lisa transforms Wyatt's car into a sleek, sexy talking car named "Nadine," with whom both the boys literally fall in love.
34	8	"Bikini Camp Slasher"	David Grossman	Ed Ferrara & Kevin Murphy	June 3, 1995	76210
Lisa and the boys become trapped in a horror movie, where they must depend on Gary's encyclopedic knowledge of slasher movie conventions to keep them alive.
35	9	"What Genie?"	Troy Miller	Kari Lizer	June 10, 1995	76213
Lisa has been forced to work as someone else's genie and erase Gary and Wyatt's memories of her existence.
36	10	"Sci-Fi Zoned"	David Grossman	Alan Cross & Tom Spezialy	June 17, 1995	76211
After Gary and Wyatt have a falling out, Lisa zaps them into the Twilight Zone-like TV show that made them friends in the first place.
37	11	"The Wyatt Brief"	Les Landau	Chris Black	June 24, 1995	76214
A glimpse into the future shows Wyatt that he is destined to steal Gary's prom date. To turn the girl off, Lisa gives him Chett's personality.
38	12	"Free Gary"	David Grossman	Jeff Vlaming	July 1, 1995	76209
Lisa tries to give the boys the "Super Bowl of wishes": being Baywatch lifeguards. At the beach, she meets a man who may be another genie.
39	13	"Quantum Wyatt"	Ron Ames	Ed Ferrara & Kevin Murphy	July 15, 1995	76219
To test out possible careers, Lisa gives Wyatt a box of magic chocolates that leap him into the bodies of various professionals.
40	14	"Fly Boy"	David Grossman	Jeff Vlaming	July 22, 1995	76212
Gary is spotted using a pair of flying shoes Lisa created, bringing FBI agents Scolder and Molly to town to investigate rumors of the paranormal.
41	15	"Teen Lisa"	Les Landau	Kari Lizer	July 29, 1995	76222
Lisa and the guys trade lives, with Lisa becoming a homely teenager and Gary and Wyatt becoming incompetent genies.
42	16	"Dead Can Dance"	David Grossman	Adam Barr & Peter Ocko	August 5, 1995	76218
A time vortex brings a visit from a brawling, boozing Donnelly ancestor, who bonds with Chett.
43	17	"The Legend of Red Brick Wallace"	Les Landau	Jeff Vlaming	August 12, 1995	76227
Lisa transports Gary and Wyatt back to the Old West to watch Gary's great great grandfather, Red Brick Wallace, defeat a gang of desperadoes with his bare hands. Unfortunately, Gary's interference threatens to change history - and get Red Brick killed.
44	18	"Spies 'R' Us"	David Grossman	Alan Cross & Tom Spezialy	September 9, 1995	76221
Gary overloads Lisa's virtual reality spy game and turns Farber High into a real-life James Bond adventure.

=== Season 4 (1996) ===
No. overall	No. in season	Title	Directed by	Written by	Original release date	Prod. code
45	1	"Searching for Boris Karloff"	Tom Spezialy	Chris Black	January 6, 1996	76228
Lisa takes Gary and Wyatt to meet the only other person who has successfully created life and inspired them to create Lisa, Dr. Victor Frankenstein.
46	2	"Men in Tights"	David Grossman	Ed Ferrara & Kevin Murphy	January 13, 1996	76225
When a zap of Lisa's magic turns into an unbeatable tag team, Chett and Wyatt become instant stars on the big time wrestling circuit.
47	3	"Puppet Love"	Michael Lange	Kari Lizer	January 20, 1996	76224
Gary tries to woo a girl, using a handsome remote-controlled "puppet man." His plan goes awry, however, when the object of his affection is more attracted to the puppet than to him.
48	4	"Chett-A-Nator"	David Grossman	Adam Barr & Peter Ocko	January 27, 1996	76226
Chett is abducted by aliens and replaced by an unstoppable android whose mission is to capture Lisa and make her the unsavory aliens' new "queen".
49	5	"Phantom Scampi"	David Grossman	Jimmy Aleck & Jim Keily	February 3, 1996	K0912
To keep Wyatt out of detention, Lisa uses her magic to turn Principal Scampi into his best friend. Unfortunately the spell goes out of control when the entire student body alienates Wyatt and Scampi tries his hand as a "Phantom of the Opera" style hero.
50	6	"Grumpy Old Genie"	Win Phelps	Jim Lincoln & Dan Studney	February 10, 1996	K0911
Lisa must deal with the humiliation of not being young and sexy when a hacker replaces her image file with a picture of Abe Vigoda.
51	7	"Funhouse of Death"	Christopher Hibler	Glen Merzer	February 24, 1996	K0909
Gary and Wyatt compete for the attention of a beautiful girl (Denise Richards). To settle the matter, Lisa locks them in a funhouse with a homicidal clown.
52	8	"It Takes a Geek"	David Grossman	Chris Black	March 2, 1996	K0913
Gary and Wyatt enlist Chett's help to rescue Lisa when she is trapped in Principal Scampi's computer.
53	9	"Slow Times at Farber High"	David Grossman	Sherri Budnick & Joanna Sandsmark	March 9, 1996	K0906
Gary gets a "brain buster" that turns smart people dumb, but he overloads it and creates a malevolent intelligence-sucking orb.
54	10	"Chett World"	Michael Lange	Glen Merzer	March 16, 1996	K0902
Lisa gives Chett a job that caters to his interests, but his bosses are hell-bent on turning all humans into macho Chett clones.
55	11	"By the Time We Got to Woodstock"	David Grossman	Ed Ferrara & Kevin Murphy	March 23, 1996	K0907
When Gary, Wyatt and Lisa time travel back into 1969, Lisa gets amnesia and believes herself to be a hippie. A stranded Gary and Wyatt try to get to the Woodstock festival to find Lisa, while Chett tries to prevent the downfall of Richard Nixon.
56	12	"You'll Never Eat Brains in This Town Again"	Ricardo Méndez Matta	Ed Ferrara & Kevin Murphy	March 30, 1996	K0908
Lisa brings in real zombies to be extras in a low-budget zombie movie.
57	13	"Demon Lisa"	David Grossman	Chris Black	April 6, 1996	K0904
Lisa is possessed by the spirit of a computer demon trying to escape cyberspace and take over the world.
58	14	"Cyborg Sam I Am"	Max Tash	Chris Black	April 13, 1996	K0905
Lisa brings Wyatt's childhood toys to life.
59	15	"It's a Wonderful Life... Without You"	Christopher Hibler	Kari Lizer	April 27, 1996	K0918
Wyatt and Lisa see what life would have been like if Wyatt had never been born, only to find that the wish has wiped them both out of existence.
60	16	"Lisa's Childhood Memories"	David Grossman	Story by : Seth Kurland; Teleplay by : Chris Black	May 4, 1996	K0915
Gary and Wyatt program Lisa with memories of a family, but her magic makes the imaginary family (complete with a secret agent dad, a warrior princess mom, and an American Gladiator boyfriend) become real.
61	17	"Lisarella"	David Grossman	Jimmy Aleck & Jim Keily	May 11, 1996	K0916
Lisa sneaks in to a ball to meet the President of the United States, and winds up falling in love with him.
62	18	"Family Affair"	Alan Cross	Jimmy Aleck & Jim Keily	May 18, 1996	K0910
Gary wishes that his girlfriend's family liked him, but they wind up liking him a little too much; Lisa tries to scare Chett out of his smoking habit.
63	19	"Gary & Wyatt's Bloodsucking Adventure"	Les Landau	Story by : Alan Cross & Kari Lizer & Tom Spezialy; Teleplay by : Kari Lizer	June 1, 1996	K0922
To be cool enough for an exclusive club, Lisa, Gary and Wyatt become harmless vampires, but they do not realize the club is full of real vampires.
64	20	"It's a Mob, Mob, Mob, Mob World"	David Grossman	Jim Lincoln & Dan Studney	June 15, 1996	K0919
Wyatt wishes that he had a close-knit loving family, and winds up in the Mafia.
65	21	"Strange Daze"	Tom Spezialy	Alan Cross & Tom Spezialy	June 22, 1996	K0901
When Lisa grants Wyatt's request for a technologically advanced school, she creates a futuristic dystopia.
66	22	"Community Property"	David Grossman	Jimmy Aleck & Jim Keily	June 29, 1996	K0923
After an argument, Gary and Wyatt go to court to see who will get custody of Lisa.
67	23	"Master Chett"	Les Landau	Glen Merzer	July 6, 1996	K0917
Chett develops an immunity to Lisa's power to erase memories, leaving him permanently aware that she is a magic genie.
68	24	"Pirates!"	Tom Spezialy	Story by : Peter Ocko & Adam Barr; Teleplay by : Ed Ferrara & Kevin Murphy	July 13, 1996	K0914
Lisa's spell brings a pirate musical to life, and Chett becomes the leader of a band of bloodthirsty singing and disco dancing pirates.
69	25	"Swallow 13"	David Grossman	Jim Lincoln & Dan Studney	August 3, 1996	K0903
When Chett swallows the directions to the hottest party in town, Wyatt would rather get shrunk down and travel to Chett's stomach than ask a girl for another copy.
70	26	"Strangers in Paradise"	David Grossman	Story by : Ed Ferrara & Kevin Murphy & Jim Lincoln & Dan Studney; Teleplay by : Ed Ferrara & Kevin Murphy	August 10, 1996	K0925
Lisa and Chett are stranded together on a desert island in the Bermuda Triangle, where magic powers do not work.

=== Season 5 (1997–98) ===
Six episodes that did not air during the series' original run eventually aired on the Sci-Fi Channel. The first two premiered July 11, 1998, with the remainder premiering as pairs of episodes July 18 and 25, 1998.

No. overall	No. in season	Title	Directed by	Written by	Original release date	Prod. code
71	1	"I Dream of Gene"	Sandy Smolan	Jeff Vlaming	January 5, 1997	K1906
Chett gets his first real competition for Lisa when she meets a fellow genie (Bruce Campbell) who works for a Texas billionaire.
72	2	"Girl Talk"	Ricardo Méndez Matta	Jimmy Aleck & Jim Keily	January 12, 1997	K1909
Lisa makes her first female friend, who cannot handle the revelation that she is a magic genie.
73	3	"Boys on the Hide"	David Grossman	Sherri Budnick & Joanna Sandsmark	January 19, 1997	K1904
The boys go on the run when they are falsely accused of defaced Scampi's portrait and turning them into fugitives from the law. Parodies "The Fugitive".
74	4	"Gary Had a Little Cram"	David Grossman	Jim Lincoln & Dan Studney	January 26, 1997	K1908
Gary tries to get into college, with the help of a magical Lisa device that makes him a great athlete.
75	5	"Forbidden Janet"	Christopher Hibler	Jimmy Aleck & Jim Keily	February 2, 1997	K1907
Lisa creates a machine that brings Wyatt's dream girl to life, but Gary and Chett ruin everything when they steal the device.
76	6	"Man's Best Friend"	Alan Cross	Kari Lizer	February 9, 1997	K1902
Touched by Chett's affection for a stray dog, Lisa temporarily turns the dog into a human.
77	7	"Show Chett"	Tom Spezialy	Chris Black	February 16, 1997	K1905
To teach Chett a lesson about treating people as sex objects, Lisa turns him into a male stripper.
78	8	"Bee in There"	David Grossman	Jimmy Aleck & Jim Keily	February 23, 1997	K1912
The boys go back in time, in their parents' bodies, to teach their younger selves to play catch.
79	9	"Future Bride"	Ricardo Méndez Matta	Adam I. Lapidus	March 7, 1997	K1914
Wyatt wishes to meet the girl he is destined to marry; Chett tries to convince Lisa that she is his future mate.
80	10	"Stalag 16"	Ricardo Méndez Matta	Ed Ferrara & Kevin Murphy	March 14, 1997	K1910
Chett and his arch-nemesis Principal Scampi must work together when they are trapped in a virtual reality game.
81	11	"I, Chettus"	Tom Spezialy	Chris Black	March 21, 1997	K1903
Chett goes back in time to ancient Rome and becomes a hero by introducing the people to jeeps and beef jerky.
82	12	"The Genie Detective"	David Grossman	Christer Hokanson & Howard Klausner	April 11, 1997	K1913
Chett butts into Lisa's black-and-white film noir game, only to find out if he dies in the game, he will die for real.
83	13	"Magic Comet Ride"	David Grossman	Jim Lincoln & Dan Studney	July 11, 1998	K1915
To find out more about herself and why her powers are so unpredictable, Lisa meets with a wise "genie master."
84	14	"School Spirits"	Tom Spezialy	Jimmy Aleck & Jim Keily	July 11, 1998	K1916
Lisa and the boys try to protect the ghosts of Farber High teachers from a creepy ghost-buster hired by Principal Scampi.
85	15	"Wicked Wish"	David Grossman	Jim Lincoln & Dan Studney	July 18, 1998	K1917
Lisa gives Wyatt's mom a magic mirror to make her feel young and beautiful, but the mirror turns her into a vain and evil witch.
86	16	"Night of the Swingin' Steves"	Ricardo Méndez Matta	Chris Black	July 18, 1998	K1918
The alien race known as "Steve" returns to ask Lisa to be their queen, and she calls in Agents Scolder and Molly to help.
87	17	"Genie Junior"	Ricardo Méndez Matta	Susannah Hardaway	July 25, 1998	K1919
To test Chett's ability to commit, Lisa makes herself pregnant.
88	18	"WS4"	David Grossman	Jim Lincoln & Dan Studney	July 25, 1998	K1920
In the series finale, when rivalries heat up between the different clubs at Farber High during the school's Groundhog Day Gala, Lisa gets the galaxy's most peaceful aliens to teach everyone how to get along. However the aliens attack the school and are seemingly unstoppable with plans to end everything when the final bell rings at 3 o'clock.
