= Campus Cops =

1996 American TV series

- Created by: Michael Baser; Frank Dungan
- Starring: Ben Bode; Ryan Hurst; Monte Markham; Jerry Kernion
- Composers: Michael Skloff; Peter Bernstein
- Country of origin: United States
- Original language: English
- No. of seasons: 1
- No. of episodes: 13

Production
- Executive producers: Andrew Nicholls and Darrell Vickers; Leslie Belzberg; John Landis
- Camera setup: Single-camera
- Running time: 30 minutes
- Production companies: Chelsey Avenue Productions; St. Clare Entertainment; MCA Television Entertainment

Original release
- Network: USA Network
- Release: January 6 – March 30, 1996

Campus Cops is an American sitcom that aired on the USA Network on Saturday nights from January 6 until March 30, 1996, for a total of 13 episodes.

== Premise ==
The series centered on bumbling campus policeman, Wayne Simko and Andy McCormack, who worked at Canfield University.

== Cast ==
- Ryan Hurst as Wayne Simko
- Ben Bode as Andy McCormack
- Jerry Kernion as Elliot Royce
- Monte Markham as Dean Walter Pilkington
- LaRita Shelby as Meg DuVry
- JD Cullum as Ray Raskin
- David Sage as Captain Hingle

== Episodes ==
No.	Title	Directed by	Written by	Original release date
1	"Muskrat Ramble"	John Landis	Michael Baser & Frank Dungan	January 6, 1996
2	"3,001"	John Landis	Chris Henchy & Andy Lieberman	1996
3	"Be My Guest"	Iain Paterson	Michael Baser & Frank Dungan	January 20, 1996
4	"A Knight's Hard Day"	Carl Gottlieb	Eve Ahlert & Dennis Drake	January 27, 1996
5	"Cop Squad"	Scott White	Chris Henchy & Andy Lieberman	1996
6	"The Alum"	Carl Gottlieb	Eve Ahlert & Dennis Drake	1996
7	"Sister, Sister"	Frank Bonner	Dave Goetsch & Jason Venokur	1996
8	"Stinky Higgins"	Scott White	Dave Goetsch & Jason Venokur	1996
9	"Free Wally"	Iain Paterson	Dave Goetsch & Jason Venokur	February 17, 1996
10	"Radio Free Wayne"	Unknown	Unknown	March 9, 1996
11	"Weekend at Hingle's"	Ron Wolotzky	Story by : Patrick Carlin; Teleplay by : Steve Billnitzer	March 16, 1996
12	"Alien Notion"	Scott White	Lisa Rosenthal	March 23, 1996
13	"The Treasure of Sierra Canfield"	Michael Amundson	Chris Henchy & Andy Lieberman	March 30, 1996
