= Bad Manners (1997 film) =

- Directed by: Jonathan Kaufer
- Screenplay by: David Gilman
- Based on: Ghost in the Machine by David Gilman
- Produced by: J. Todd Harris; Alan Kaplan; Stephen Nemeth
- Starring: David Strathairn; Bonnie Bedelia; Saul Rubinek; Caroleen Feeney
- Cinematography: Denis Maloney
- Edited by: Robin Katz
- Music by: Ira Newborn
- Distributed by: Phaedra Cinema
- Release date: October 25, 1997
- Running time: 88 minutes
- Country: United States
- Language: English

Bad Manners is a 1997 American comedy drama film directed by Jonathan Kaufer and starring David Strathairn, Bonnie Bedelia and Saul Rubinek. It is based on the 1993 play Ghost in the Machine by David Gilman, who also wrote the screenplay.

== Cast ==
- David Strathairn as Wes Westlund
- Bonnie Bedelia as Nancy Westlund
- Saul Rubinek as Matt Carroll
- Caroleen Feeney as Kim Matthews
- Julie Harris as Professor Harper
- Robin Poley as First Musicologist
- Daniel Koch as Second Musicologist
- Steve Forbert as Coffeehouse Troubadour

== Reception ==
The film received positive reviews from critics and has an 85% rating on Rotten Tomatoes.

Roger Ebert gave the film three stars.

Owen Gleiberman of Entertainment Weekly gave the film a B.
