= Big Chill =

Big Chill can refer to:

- The Big Chill (music festival), an annual music and comedy festival held in England
- The Big Chill (film), a 1983 American film directed by Lawrence Kasdan
- The Big Chill at the Big House, a 2010 U.S. college ice hockey game that set an attendance world record
- "The Big Chill" (The Batman), an episode from The Batman
- Big Chill, a character in Ben 10
- A variant of the colloquial term "Big Freeze" for the heat death of the universe
- The Big Chill Cafe, restaurant in Delhi, India
- "The Big Chill", a season 1 episode of The Casagrandes

== See also ==
- The Bigg Chill, a frozen yogurt shop in Westwood, Los Angeles
- Big Freeze (disambiguation)
