= Kraven the Hunter (film) =

2024 film by J. C. Chandor

- Theatrical release poster
- Directed by: J.C. Chandor
- Screenplay by: Art Marcum Matt Holloway; Richard Wenk
- Story by: Richard Wenk
- Based on: Marvel Comics
- Produced by: Avi Arad; Matt Tolmach; David Householter
- Starring: Aaron Taylor-Johnson; Ariana DeBose; Fred Hechinger; Alessandro Nivola; Christopher Abbott; Russell Crowe
- Cinematography: Ben Davis
- Edited by: Chris Lebenzon
- Music by: Benjamin Wallfisch; Evgueni Galperine; Sacha Galperine
- Production companies: Columbia Pictures; Marvel Entertainment; Arad Productions; Matt Tolmach Productions
- Distributed by: Sony Pictures Releasing
- Release date: December 13, 2024 (United States)
- Running time: 127 minutes
- Country: United States
- Language: English
- Budget: $110–130 million
- Box office: $62 million

Kraven the Hunter is a 2024 American superhero film based on the Marvel Comics character. It is the sixth film in Sony's Spider-Man Universe (SSU). Aaron Taylor-Johnson stars as Kraven, alongside Ariana DeBose, Fred Hechinger, Alessandro Nivola, Christopher Abbott, and Russell Crowe. Directed by J.C. Chandor and written by Richard Wenk, Art Marcum and Matt Holloway, the film explores Kraven's relationship with his father and his path to becoming the greatest hunter.

Kraven was considered for film appearances several times before Sony Pictures became interested in a standalone film for the character, as part of its new shared universe, in mid-2017. Wenk was hired in August 2018, and Chandor entered negotiations to direct in August 2020, and was confirmed in May 2021 when Taylor-Johnson was cast. Filming took place from late March until mid-June 2022 in London, Iceland, and Glasgow.

Following two years of delays, Kraven the Hunter was released in the United States on December 13, 2024, by Sony Pictures Releasing. The film received negative reviews from critics and was a box-office failure, grossing $62 million worldwide against a $110–130 million budget.

== Plot ==
Following his mother's death, Sergei Kravinoff and his half-brother Dmitri are taken by their father, Nikolai Kravinoff, to prepare to inherit his drug trafficking operations. During a hunting trip in Ghana, Sergei is injured while protecting Dmitri from a lion. The lion brings him to a girl named Calypso, who heals him with a serum and summons help, leaving behind a tarot card. Sergei soon discovers that the serum has given him enhanced, animalistic physical abilities. When Nikolai reveals that he killed the lion to teach his sons a lesson, Sergei is disgusted and flees to an animal sanctuary in Russia owned by his mother.

Sixteen years later, Sergei, now known as Kraven, is a vigilante who hunts criminals. After killing an arms trafficker in a Russian prison, he travels to London for Dmitri's birthday. Their reunion is cut short when mercenaries abduct Dmitri. When Nikolai refuses to pay the ransom, Kraven tracks down Calypso, now a lawyer, and persuades her to help him. Meanwhile, Dmitri meets the mastermind behind his kidnapping, Aleksei Sytsevich, who underwent an experiment by Miles Warren that gave him the strength and appearance of a rhinoceros. Aleksei proposes that Dmitri join him in overthrowing Nikolai. After discovering Kraven's connection to Dmitri, Aleksei lures Kraven to a monastery in Turkey, where Kraven survives an ambush. Aleksei then hires the Foreigner, an assassin who uses ocular hypnosis to disorient his targets, to kill him.

Aleksei and the Foreigner track Kraven and Calypso to the sanctuary and ambush them. The Foreigner drugs Kraven with a neurotoxin and attacks him, but Calypso kills the Foreigner with a crossbow and revives Kraven. Kraven then uses a buffalo stampede to trap Aleksei. Although Aleksei transforms into the Rhino and briefly overpowers him, Kraven kills him.

Realizing that Nikolai was the one who revealed his existence to Aleksei, Kraven confronts his father. Nikolai admits that he knew Aleksei was targeting him and manipulated his sons into eliminating the threat. Kraven steals ammunition and uses it to lure a bear into killing Nikolai.

One year later, Kraven visits Dmitri and is shocked to learn that he has willingly inherited their father's criminal empire. Dmitri reveals that Warren's experiments have also given him shapeshifting abilities. He tells Kraven that, despite his claims of moral superiority, he and Nikolai are alike: both are hunters seeking their next great trophy. At home, Kraven finds a note from Nikolai and a vest made from the skin of the lion Nikolai killed years earlier. He puts on the vest, embracing the identity his father helped create.

== Cast ==
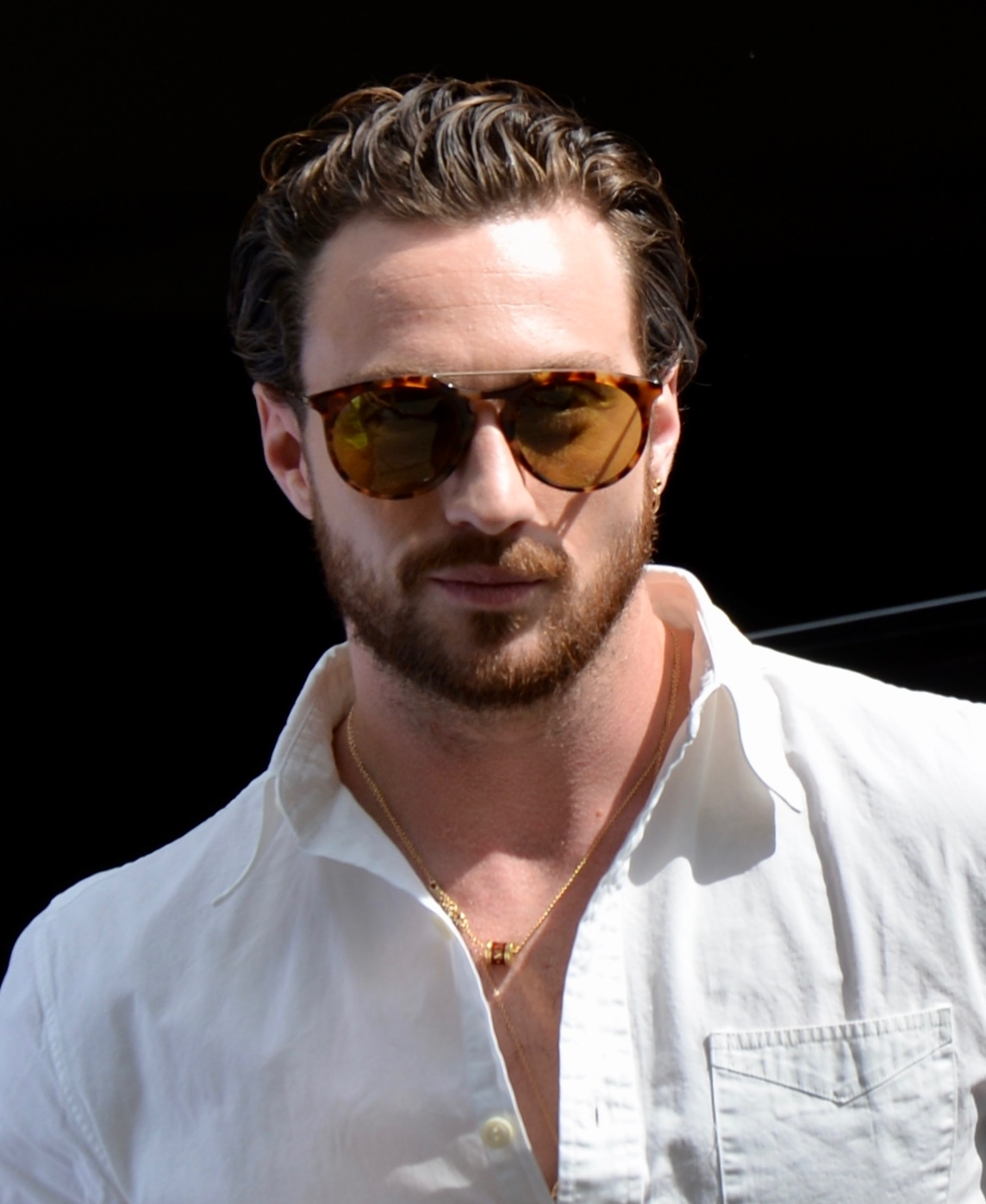
Aaron Taylor-Johnson plays Kraven.

- Aaron Taylor-Johnson as Sergei Kravinoff / Kraven the Hunter:
  A hunter-gatherer. Taylor-Johnson described his take on the character as an apex predator and a conservationist but not a poacher, a "protector of the natural world", and an "animal lover".
  - Levi Miller portrays a young Sergei.
- Ariana DeBose as Calypso Ezili: A voodoo priestess and lawyer who aids Kraven.
  - Diaana Babnicova plays young Calypso.
- Fred Hechinger as Dmitri Kravinoff / Chameleon: Kraven's estranged half-brother who is a master of disguise, capable of mimicking other's voices.
  - Billy Barratt portrays a young Dmitri.
- Alessandro Nivola as Aleksei Sytsevich / Rhino: A Russian mercenary who can transform into a human-rhinoceros hybrid and controls the transformation using a serum.
- Christopher Abbott as the Foreigner: An assassin who uses ocular hypnosis to slow time and is hired by Aleksei.
- Russell Crowe as Nikolai Kravinoff: Kraven's estranged father, and a ruthless crime lord and drug trafficker.
- Murat Seven as Ömer Ozdemir, a Turkish assassin hired by Aleksei.
- Yuri Kolokolnikov as Semyon Chorney, a Russian crime lord Kraven encounters in prison.
- Tom Reed as Bert, Aleksei's second-in-command.

Additionally, Masha Vasyukova appears as Kraven's mother. Guillaume Delaunay plays Mofo, a large and intimidating prisoner who becomes Kraven's cellmate.

== Production ==
=== Development ===
Director Sam Raimi planned to include the Marvel Comics character Kraven the Hunter in his fourth Spider-Man film before that project was canceled in favor of The Amazing Spider-Man (2012), a reboot of the franchise. Sony Pictures announced plans in December 2013 for The Amazing Spider-Man 2 (2014) to establish a shared universe—inspired by the Marvel Cinematic Universe (MCU)—based on the Marvel properties they held the rights to. Kraven was teased in that film, with its director Marc Webb expressing interest in seeing the character appear on film.

In February 2015, Sony and Marvel Studios announced a new partnership to co-produce the film Spider-Man: Homecoming (2017), and integrate the Spider-Man character with Marvel's MCU. In May 2017, Sony announced its own shared universe, later named "Sony's Spider-Man Universe" (SSU). Sony intended this to be "adjunct" to their MCU Spider-Man films, featuring Spider-Man related properties beginning with Venom (2018). The studio was considering a Kraven film for the universe. Simultaneously, director Ryan Coogler hoped to include the character in his MCU film Black Panther (2018) because of a fight between Black Panther and Kraven in Christopher Priest's Black Panther comic book run. Due to the film's outline being based on Priest's run, Coogler asked Marvel if they could use Kraven due to his admiration for Spider-Man: The Animated Series (1994–1998). Marvel asked Sony for permission to use the character, but Sony declined.

Richard Wenk was hired to write a screenplay for Kraven the Hunter in August 2018, a month after the successful release of Sony's The Equalizer 2 (2018), which he wrote. The project was billed as "the next chapter" of Sony's shared universe. Wenk was tasked with introducing Kraven to audiences and figuring out which character he could hunt in the film since Spider-Man, considered to be Kraven's "white whale" in the comic books, was unlikely to appear due to the MCU deal. Whether the film would target adult audiences would depend on the audience response to Venom's darker approach.

In October, Wenk said he was "cracking" the story and tone of the film before beginning scripting. He intended to adhere to the character's comic book lore, including by featuring Kraven fighting Spider-Man. Wenk said Sony intended to adapt the Kraven's Last Hunt (1987) comic book storyline, and there were ongoing discussions over whether to do that in this film or a later one. Wenk compared the latter approach to the two-part film Kill Bill (2003/2004). He expressed interest in having Equalizer director Antoine Fuqua join the film; Fuqua considered directing Sony's Marvel-based film Morbius (2022), and would decide on directing Kraven based on the script. Sony confirmed that a film featuring Kraven was in development in March 2019.

Jon Watts, the director of Homecoming and its sequel Spider-Man: Far From Home (2019), expressed interest in featuring Kraven in a potential third Spider-Man film set within the MCU; Watts pitched a film pitting Peter Parker / Spider-Man against Kraven to Spider-Man star Tom Holland, but this idea was abandoned in favor of the multiversal story of Spider-Man: No Way Home (2021).

By August 2020, Art Marcum and Matt Holloway had re-written the script, after doing uncredited rewrites for Morbius. At that time, J.C. Chandor entered talks to direct the film, while Matt Tolmach, Avi Arad, and David Householter were set as producers. Chandor was confirmed as director in May 2021, when Aaron Taylor-Johnson was cast to star as Kraven, and signed on to portray the character in multiple films. Sony had previously approached actors such as Brad Pitt, Keanu Reeves, John David Washington and Adam Driver for the role, with Lewis Pullman also auditionining, but Sony executives moved quickly to cast Taylor-Johnson after they were "blow[n] away" by early footage of him in the film Bullet Train (2022). Taylor-Johnson began negotiations shortly after an initial phone call with Chandor and Tolmach. By July, Jodie Turner-Smith was reportedly in talks to portray Kraven's love interest, Calypso.

That October, Holland said he and Pascal had discussed him potentially reprising his role as Spider-Man in the film. Neither Holland nor his character appeared in the finished film; according to a Sony source who spoke to Variety, The Walt Disney Company, which held the rights to the MCU, never forbade Sony from using Holland or the Peter Parker / Spider-Man character, with the character appearing in the Sony Pictures Animation feature film Spider-Man: Into the Spider-Verse (2018), but Sony felt that audiences would not accept Holland's live-action Spider-Man unexpectedly appearing in a non-MCU film, especially after No Way Home and Doctor Strange in the Multiverse of Madness (2022) established definitive boundaries for the MCU.

The film was greenlit with a production budget of $90 million, but due to the 2023 writers and actors strike the costs increased. The final cost was reportedly as high $130 million, but Variety disputed this figure, estimating it cost "upward of $110 million".

=== Pre-production ===
Russell Crowe was cast in an undisclosed role in early February 2022. The Hollywood Reporter noted that many of the main characters in the film would be members of Kraven's family, with Crowe potentially portraying Kraven's father. By then, Kodi Smit-McPhee had been offered the role of Chameleon, Kraven's half-brother, but declined due to a scheduling conflict. Turner-Smith was also confirmed to have not been cast as Calypso. Later in February, Fred Hechinger joined the cast, reportedly as Chameleon. In March, Ariana DeBose joined the cast, reportedly in the Calypso role, Alessandro Nivola was cast as a villain, and Christopher Abbott was cast as the film's main villain, which was reported to be the Foreigner. Nivola said he joined the film to work with Chandor again after A Most Violent Year (2014). Taylor-Johnson was preparing for stunt training with Chandor in England, just outside of London, for the following couple of weeks.

=== Filming ===
Filming occurred in Iceland in early February 2022, at Lake Mývatn, using the working title Safari. TrueNorth Productions handled the production services, with an 80-person crew involved in the shooting over two days. Principal photography began on March 20, 2022, in London, England, under the working title Spiral. Ben Davis served as cinematographer after doing so for several MCU films. Levi Miller joined the cast in April, and DeBose confirmed that she was portraying Calypso in the film a month later when she had already been filming in London. In mid-June, Taylor-Johnson revealed that he had wrapped filming and stated that the film was shot entirely on location, which he said "add[ed] something really beautiful" to the personal story, and called it important for the authenticity of the character. Nivola also wrapped filming at that time, and said the characters' physical abilities in the film were grounded in reality, while Chandor described it as depicting the "most incredible Olympic athlete you've ever seen". While filming his scenes, Abbott couldn't comprehend what his character's powers were and felt that none of the filmmakers had a good answer to his questions, leading him to foresee that the film wouldn't achieve greatness early on filming. Filming also took place in Glasgow, Scotland.

=== Post-production ===
In August 2022, Nivola stated that the film would include a time jump and that his character would only physically transform in the final act, so he was not required to do extensive green screen work. He described it as a "classic villain role" with "complex psychology and personal history to draw on". The following month, Hechinger confirmed that he was portraying Dmitri Smerdyakov / Chameleon. Later in September, the film's release date was delayed to October 6, 2023, from January 13, 2023. In April 2023, Crowe and Nivola were confirmed to be respectively portraying Kraven's father and the character Rhino. Taylor-Johnson confirmed that the film would receive an R rating by the Motion Picture Association, the first SSU film and the first Spider-Man related project overall to do so. Due to the 2023 SAG-AFTRA strike in July, the film's release date was delayed to August 30, 2024. In August 2023, the film's final writing credits were given: Wenk received sole credit for the story and shared credit for the screenplay with Marcum and Holloway, while off-screen additional literary credit was given to Donny Cates, Chris Bremner, Chandor, Adamma Ebo, Adanne Ebo, Zak Olkewicz, and Oren Uziel.

In April 2024, the film's release date was further delayed to December 13, 2024, to avoid competition from other franchise films releasing around the prior August date. Tolmach also attributed the release delay as a strategic reflection of Sony's excitement for the film. Chandor felt that the delays allowed him to "sharpen" the characters and "tighten" the plot, deeming the reshoots strategic and effective. Despite the disastrous underperformance of Madame Web (2024), Sony felt optimistic that Kraven the Hunter would be more in line with the Venom films, with Chandor opining that the film would surprise the audience once it released. Chris Lebenzon serves as the film's editor.

=== Music ===
Benjamin Wallfisch was hired in June 2023 to compose the score for the film. Sometime later, Sacha and Evgueni Galperine were added as composers.

== Marketing ==
Sony debuted the first footage from the film in a "show reel" of the studio's upcoming films at CinemaCon in April 2022. The first trailer was showcased during Sony's panel at CinemaCon in April 2023. On June 19, 2023, the trailer leaked online and was subsequently followed by the official poster and a red band trailer the same day. The second trailer was released on August 14, 2024, featuring the song "The Man Comes Around" (2002) by Johnny Cash. Ellise Shafer of Variety said Kraven "shows no mercy" in the trailer with his gruesome methods, feeling it "transforms [Kraven] from your average hitman into the fur-wearing baddie" the character is known as in the comics. In November, a commercial aired during the 2024 NFL season featuring members of the Baltimore Ravens, particularly kicker Justin Tucker who suggested renaming the team the "Baltimore Kravens". Sony Pictures released the first eight minutes of the film on its YouTube channel on December 2. Bradley Russell at Total Film felt releasing the footage for free a week ahead of the film's release was a surprise, but also believed it was a "bold tactic that might just sell" audiences to watch the film.

== Release ==
=== Theatrical ===
Kraven the Hunter was theatrically released in the United States on December 13, 2024, in IMAX and premium large formats (PLFs). It was previously scheduled for release on January 13, 2023, October 6, 2023, and August 30, 2024.

=== Home media ===
Kraven the Hunter was released on digital download on January 14, 2025, and on 4K Ultra HD, Blu-ray, and DVD on March 4, by Sony Pictures Home Entertainment. It was released on Netflix in the U.S. on March 13.

In the United States, Kraven the Hunter ranked No. 1 on Fandango's VOD chart and No. 2 on iTunes for the week of January 13–19. The film held the top spot on iTunes for its first three days before moving to second place. It later ranked third in overall disc sales and fourth on the Blu-ray sales chart for the week ending March 8. High-definition formats made up 47% of its total sales, with 45% from standard Blu-ray and 2% from 4K Ultra HD. The film was later No. 4 on both the Circana VideoScan First Alert chart and the Blu-ray sales chart for the week ending March 15. Kraven the Hunter ranked No. 36 on the Top Selling Titles on Disc (DVD and Blu-ray combined) of 2025. It recorded a sales index of 16.55 relative to the year's top-selling title. Blu-ray formats accounted for 44% of total unit sales, including a 6% share from 4K Ultra HD.

In the United Kingdom, Kraven the Hunter climbed five spots to re-enter the UK's Official Film Chart Top 10 for the week ending March 20, having previously peaked at No. 5.

On Netflix, Kraven the Hunter reached No. 1 on the Top 10 Movies in the United States chart as of March 14. The film later garnered 7.1 million views and 15 million hours viewed on the platform, placing it behind The Electric State and Plankton: The Movie. Analytics company Samba TV, which gathers viewership data from certain smart TVs and content providers, reported that the film was the sixth-most streamed title from March 10–16. Nielsen Media Research, which records streaming viewership on certain American television screens, calculated that Kraven the Hunter was streamed for 911 million minutes during the week of March 10–16, ranking as the third most-streamed film and the eighth most-streamed program overall. In the following week, from March 17–23, the film recorded 706 million minutes of watch time, making it the fifth most-streamed film for that period. From March 24–30, Kraven the Hunter was streamed for 336 million minutes, remaining the fifth most-streamed film of the week. Between January and June 2025, it accumulated a total of 2.968 billion minutes streamed, ranking as the eleventh most-streamed film in that period. For the full year, Kraven the Hunter was watched for 3.67 billion minutes, placing ninth among the most-streamed films for general audiences in 2025.

== Reception ==
=== Box office ===
Kraven the Hunter grossed $25 million in the United States and Canada, and $37 million in other territories, for a worldwide total of $62 million. Deadline Hollywood calculated the film lost the studio $71 million, when factoring together all expenses and revenues.

In the United States and Canada, Kraven the Hunter was released alongside The Lord of the Rings: The War of the Rohirrim, and was projected to gross $13–15 million from 3,211 theaters in its opening weekend. The film made $4.8 million on its first day, and went on to debut to $11 million, finishing third behind holdovers Moana 2 and Wicked. The film made $3.1 million in its second weekend, for a per-screen average of $950. It dropped out of the box office top ten in its third weekend.

=== Critical response ===
The film received negative reviews from critics. On the review aggregator website Rotten Tomatoes, 15% of 158 critics' reviews are positive, with an average rating of 4/10. The website's consensus reads: "Claiming no trophies with its rote story and shoddy special effects, Kraven the Hunter turns out to be a paper tiger." Metacritic, which uses a weighted average, assigned the film a score of 35 out of 100, based on 41 critics, indicating "generally unfavorable" reviews. Audiences surveyed by CinemaScore gave the film an average grade of "C" on an A+ to F scale, while those polled by PostTrak gave it a 59% overall positive score.

Lyvie Scott of Inverse wrote, "A clunky, crowded script, muddy visual effects, and glaringly obvious ADR bog down a promising premise. It's not camp enough to become a cult classic, and it lacks the conviction to carry its most ambitious ideas to the finish line." David Ehrlich of IndieWire gave the film a C− grade, stating that 'the CGI devolves from "adorably cartoonish" to "done as cheaply as possible by a studio trying to cut its losses" so fast that it comes dangerously close to Scorpion King territory by the end.' The Daily Telegraph's Tim Robey gave it one out of five stars, writing, "Last orders can't come soon enough for the whole parade of supervillains, superheroes, or however they're now choosing to identify. This is rock bottom."

Ian Freer of Empire gave it two out of five stars, writing, "This all feels a long way from Chandor's glory days of Margin Call and All Is Lost. Save the occasional flourish, Kraven the Hunter is limp, tired, uninvolving superhero fare." Peter Bradshaw of The Guardian also gave it 2 out of 5 stars, saying that Chandor "does a serviceable job, but the delirious craziness that once made the superhero genre so watchable is not really in evidence. Kraven is a so-so character in a so-so film and the superhero revival is as far away as ever." The Hindu's Gopinath Rajendran wrote, "Not only is the wafer-thin plot painfully predictable but the secondary characters, despite being played by able performers, such [sic] Academy Award-winner Ariana DeBose, are reduced to one-dimensional muppets who add little to the overall narrative."

The A.V. Club's Jesse Hassenger gave the film a B− grade, writing, "while all of the previous movies in this barely-series seemed scrambled together in a panic, Chandor's movie seems scrambled together with a great deal of confidence and a bit of style." Adam Graham of The Detroit News said the film "is far from the cream of the crop in the superhero space, but non-discerning comic book fans may appreciate the spoils of this bounty" and gave it a C+ grade. Kevin Maher of The Times gave it three out of five stars, saying it "remains ludicrous to the end but it's never anything less than entertaining."

=== Other responses ===
Sony Pictures CEO Tony Vinciquerra blamed critics for Kraven the Hunter's box office failure, insisting that audiences who saw the film loved it and comparing it to the Netflix viewing numbers that Madame Web (2024) received. Alessandro Nivola was more neutral, adding that while his experience filming the movie was "joyful", he figured that the overall quality came down to the editing. One particularly notable sequence where Nivola's character makes an odd guttural scream was acknowledged by the actor as being Internet meme-worthy. He had made what he referred to as a "silent scream", but the sound was changed in post. In August 2026, Tom Rothman acknowledged the failure of Kraven the Hunter compared to the Venom trilogy, admitting that the audience wasn't satisfied with and didn't respond to it whether they assessed the film fairly or not or if the characters had a worthwhile potential. Christopher Abbott, acknowledged the film's shortcomings, adding that he wasn't sure what his character was supposed to be or how his abilities worked and that director J. C. Chandor "owed" him for making the movie.

=== Accolades ===
Award	Date of ceremony	Category	Recipient(s)	Result	Ref.
Golden Raspberry Awards	February 28, 2025	Worst Remake, Rip-off or Sequel	Kraven the Hunter	Nominated	
Golden Raspberry Awards	February 28, 2025	Worst Supporting Actress	Ariana DeBose (also for Argylle)	Nominated	
Golden Raspberry Awards	February 28, 2025	Worst Screenplay	Art Marcum, Matt Holloway, and Richard Wenk	Nominated	

=== Viewership ===
According to data from Showlabs, Kraven the Hunter ranked third on Netflix in the United States during the week of 10–16 March 2025.

== Franchise ==
Chandor stated he was willing to make a second and final film featuring the character, based on Kraven's Last Hunt and setting Kraven against Spider-Man. "It's obviously very tragic and sad... but the character we're trying to create is one who could realistically, if this film is a success, end with Last Hunt. Similarly, Taylor-Johnson expressed interest in a Sinister Six crossover film. In December 2024, following the film's projected financial failure, it was reported that Kraven would be the final film in Sony's Spider-Man Universe, ending any chance for a sequel or crossover. A later report from Variety stated that Sony had not technically established an official shared universe because it did not connect their narratives, and was not likely to stop making films for other characters, such as Venom, which were successful. In February 2026, Sony Pictures chairman Tom Rothman confirmed that Sony planned to continue its franchise through a "fresh reboot" overseen by different individuals. In August 2026, Rothman stated that there were no spin-offs in active development.

The use of the character Chameleon by Sony in this film, prevented his use in Spider-Man: Brand New Day (2026) forcing writers Chris McKenna and Erik Sommers to consider other options, ultimately choosing Jean Grey instead.
