= Disavowed =

American television series

- Genre: Action thriller
- Created by: Art Marcum; Matt Holloway
- Starring: James Marsden; Norman Reedus; Sylvia Hoeks; Bokeem Woodbine; Noma Dumezweni; Daniel Zovatto; Mia Tharia; J. David Hinze; Sonita Henry; Daniel Henney; Sebastian Koch
- Country of origin: United States
- Original language: English

Production
- Executive producers: Art Marcum; Matt Holloway; Rebecca Hobbs; Tom Spezialy; Theresa Kang; Caroline Garity; James Marsden; Michelle MacLaren
- Production companies: Apple Studios; Blue Marble Pictures

Original release
- Network: Apple TV

Disavowed is an upcoming Apple TV action thriller television series created by Art Marcum and Matt Holloway, starring James Marsden and Norman Reedus.

== Premise ==
A CIA operative is outcast from the organisation after his partner is killed and embarks on a vigilante mission to find the assassin, and claim the federal bounty.

== Cast ==
- James Marsden as Brad Griffin
- Norman Reedus
- Sylvia Hoeks
- Bokeem Woodbine
- Noma Dumezweni
- Daniel Zovatto
- Mia Tharia
- J. David Hinze as Xavier
- Sonita Henry
- Daniel Henney as Jae Chun
- Sebastian Koch

== Production ==
=== Development ===
Created by Art Marcum and Matt Holloway, the pair are also executive producers on the series which is produced by Apple Studios and Blue Marble Pictures. Tom Spezialy, Theresa Kang and Caroline Garity and James Marsden are also executive producers along with Rebecca Hobbs under her overall deal with Apple TV. Michelle MacLaren is director of the first two episodes and is also an executive producer.

=== Casting ===
In May 2026, James Marsden was cast in the lead role as CIA Case Officer Brad Griffin. Norman Reedus joined the cast in August. In September, Sylvia Hoeks, Bokeem Woodbine, J. David Hinze, Noma Dumezweni, Daniel Zovatto, Mia Tharia, and Sonita Henry joined the cast. In October, Daniel Henney and Sebastian Koch joined the series.

=== Filming ===
The principal photography began in Dubrovnik, Croatia in October 2026.
