= Big Freeze (disambiguation) =

Big Freeze is a hypothetical scenario where the universe continues to expand forever and eventually all matter reaches a final uniform state.

Big Freeze is also a hypothetical scenario in the future the universe in which the Universe is infinitely filled with phantom energy.

Big Freeze may also refer to:

- The Great Frost of 1709
- The winter of 1946–47 in the United Kingdom
- The winter of 1962–63 in the United Kingdom
- 1987 United Kingdom and Ireland cold wave
- The winter of 2009–10 in Great Britain and Ireland
- The Big Freeze (film), a 1993 silent film by director Eric Sykes
- The Land Before Time VIII: The Big Freeze, a 2001 direct-to-video animated adventure musical film, directed by Charles Grosvenor
- The Big Freeze at the 'G, an annual charity event held at the Australian Football League's King's Birthday match
- The Big Freeze, a book by Philip Reeve in the Buster Bayliss series
- "Big Freeze" (song), a song by Muse, from the album The 2nd Law
- The Big Freeze (album), a 2019 album by Laura Stevenson

== See also ==
- Big Chill (disambiguation)
