= Soup for One (film) =

1982 film by Jonathan Kaufer

- Theatrical release poster
- Directed by: Jonathan Kaufer
- Written by: Jonathan Kaufer
- Produced by: Marvin Worth
- Starring: Saul Rubinek; Marcia Strassman; Gerrit Graham
- Cinematography: Fred Schuler
- Edited by: David Rawlins
- Music by: Nile Rodgers; Bernard Edwards; Johnny Mandel
- Distributed by: Warner Bros. Pictures
- Release date: April 30, 1982
- Running time: 84 minutes
- Country: United States
- Language: English

Soup for One is a 1982 American sex comedy film directed and written by Jonathan Kaufer and produced by Marvin Worth. While the film was a box-office failure (mostly due to mixed reviews over its gratuitous sex scenes, including one involving S&M), it is best remembered for its soundtrack, which was produced by Nile Rodgers and Bernard Edwards of the group Chic, who performed the title track.

== Plot ==
Allan, a Jewish cable television producer in New York City, is determined to find the perfect woman, and he even goes so far as having a description of what she would look like done on an artist sketch. Before he can encounter the girl of his dreams, he finds himself encountering a series of disastrous dating roadblocks. He finally meets Maria, who seems to be his perfect woman, and tries to make the relationship work.

== Cast ==
- Saul Rubinek as Allan Martin
- Marcia Strassman as Maria Giannini
- Gerrit Graham as Brian Reed
- Teddy Pendergrass as Night Club Singer
- Richard Libertini as Angelo Giannini
- Andrea Martin as Concord Seductress
- Mordecai Lawner as Furniture Salesman
- Lewis J. Stadlen as Allan's Father
- Joanna Merlin as Allan's Mother
- Christine Baranski as Blonde in Bar
- Ellen March as Blind Date
- Maury Chaykin as Dr. Wexler
- Deborah Offner as Girl in Neon Bedroom
- Michael Jeter as Mr. Kelp
- Anna Deavere Smith as Deborah
- Laura Dean as Linda
- Marley Friedman as Zak
- Andrew Friedman as Zak
- Jessica James as Miss Farr
- Kate Lynch as WPCP Receptionist
- Suzzy Roche as Girl #1
- Claudia Cron as Girl #2
- Cheri Jamison as Girl #3
- Hilary Shepard as Girl #4
- Libby Boone as Girl #5
- Catherine Lee Smith as Girl #6
- Marisa Smith as Concord Dental Assistant
- Jaime Tirelli as WPCP Announcer
- Cristina San Juan as WPCP Weathergirl
- James Rebhorn as Lawyer
- Ron Faber as Man with Video Tapes
- Gloria Cromwell as Mrs. Franken
- Thomas Quinn as Police Officer
- Rick Lieberman as Sketch Artist
- Ellie Covan as Concord Registration Woman
- Bo Rucker as Man in Washington Sq. Park
- Jack Chandler as Stoned Cameraman
- Michael Pearlman as Young Allan
- Lauren Sautner as Young Rhonda
- Karen Werner as Receptionist
- Maggie Wheeler as Nurse
- Max Gulak as Italian Waiter
- William Cuellar as Chief Running Brook
- Mitchell Jason as Judge
- Sherrie Bender as Topless Girl at Door
- Kim Chan as Harold the Cook
- Linda Ray as Sally in Pool
- Lisa Parker as A Girl in Pool
- Merwin Goldsmith as Mr. Blum
- Olivia K. Le'Aauanae as Fire Knife Dancer
- Victor Truro as Man at Cellmates
- Anthony Cesare as Man at River Cafe
- Marvin Beck as Wedding Guest (uncredited)
- Jennifer Delora as Girl at Bar (uncredited)

== Soundtrack ==
The soundtrack album was produced by Nile Rodgers and Bernard Edwards of the band Chic. In addition to the track "Soup for One" (Pop #80, R&B #14), Chic performed several other tracks for the soundtrack: "Tavern on the Green" and "I Want Your Love" (Pop #7, R&B #5), which was previously a hit for Chic in 1979. "Open Up", originally released on Chic's 1980 album Real People, was featured in the film but did not appear on the soundtrack album. "I Work for a Living" and "Riding" were written by Rodgers and Edwards for Chic vocalist Fonzi Thornton for an unreleased solo album (the latter track was featured in the film but did not appear on the soundtrack).

The Sister Sledge track "Let's Go on Vacation" was originally from their 1980 album Love Somebody Today, written and produced by Rodgers and Edwards. Likewise, the Debbie Harry track "Jump Jump" was taken from her 1981 solo album KooKoo which Rodgers and Edwards produced.

Rodgers and Edwards also wrote two other songs for the film, one by Teddy Pendergrass ("Dream Girl", which he performs during a cameo appearance in the film as a nightclub singer) and the track "Why" by Carly Simon, which was a top ten hit in the UK.

The album, released on WEA/Mirage Records, was reissued in 2015 on compact disc.

== Reception ==
The film opened on April 30, 1982, in New York City, parts of New Jersey, Toronto, and Cincinnati; most of the reviews it received in each market were negative.

Ron Base of The Toronto Star likened Rubinek's character to John Hinckley Jr., who attempted to assassinate then-President Ronald Reagan a year before; he also derided director-writer Kaufer's style of comedy, saying that "his desperation to squeeze out a laugh is unparalleled; one expects him to start shooting dogs in hopes it will draw a chuckle from someone in the audience."

Rex Reed described it as "an ethnic creep show that pretends to be a farce about the singles scene in New York City, to no avail. Jonathan Kaufer, the writer-director, doesn't have a clue about how to sustain a coherent plot narrative, and the actors are abysmal." Reed also described Rubinek as "somebody I hope never to encounter again on either a movie screen or the stoop outside Zabar's".

Alex Kaneas of Newsday gave the film two stars and wrote that it was a film that "badly wants to make us laugh, so it strains and, losing its tenuous hold on reality, as it often does, ceases to become funny as parody. 'Soup,' now at area theaters, also keeps telling us what's funny instead of allowing us to discover it for ourselves. One shot, for example, of a Greenwich Village theater poster—Joseph Papp Presents 'The Home Life of Leonid Brezhnev'—would have been quite enough. But 'Soup' has to elbow us in the ribs with it." He also noted that "there seems to be, in the Neil Simony broth of 'Soup,' with its shtik and its fatuous characters who seem to have no reason for existence other than to deliver one-liners, a Woody Allen soul struggling for liberation. As it is, though, it's a derivative, less than "meaningful" relationship."

Richard Freedman of The Star Ledger called the film "by and large too arch and feebly satiric to make much impact. And Rubinek, who was fine as the hero's comedian pal in 'Ticket to Heaven,' is too concerned with following in the footsteps of Woody Allen and Dudley Moore as an offbeat lover to find a style of his own as effective as theirs."

Tom McElfresh of The Cincinnati Enquirer called the film's main character "silly, mawkishly sentimental, Insensitive[,] monumentally boring [and] ludicrous enough to promote yawns and disbelief instead of the intended belly laughs." He also said that "Kaufer's background is all television and it shows. His characters have the cardboard emotions of stock drama and his events the lusterless, ludicrous silliness of sitcoms. On the big screen the lush budget and Fred Schuler's romanticized cinematography of Manhattan demonstrate just how thin the soup is."

Vincent Canby wrote a more mildly positive review of the film in The New York Times, which read:

If movies were people, you might say that Soup for One is still struggling to get through its awkward age. It's energetic, sort of gawky, sometimes obnoxious, occasionally very funny and frequently endearing. All of the people connected with it are up-and-coming new talents.

These include Jonathan Kaufer, the 26-year-old writer and director of the film, his first feature; Saul Rubinek, who may one day be Canada's answer to Dudley Moore; Marcia Strassman, known mainly for her appearances on television's Welcome Back, Kotter, and Gerrit Graham, who's not exactly a new face but who has yet to receive the recognition he deserves for his comic contributions to films like Used Cars and Hi, Mom.

At its best, Soup for One recalls the New York comedies of Woody Allen.

[ . . . ]

The movie's jokes at the expense of the singles life are not terrifically fresh, even during an elaborate sequence filmed at the Concord Hotel, and the wisecracks are sometimes too desperately knowing. Mr. Kaufer has a good comic eye and ear, but he has to be tougher on himself. He shouldn't be satisfied with second-best ideas when he is obviously capable of better.

Mr. Rubinek, who made such a favorable impression as the would-be stand-up comic in Ticket to Heaven, is on his way to becoming a major comic actor. Too often in Soup for One, however, he is almost as annoying as the other characters say he is. Miss Strassman, in the Diane Keaton role, is both funny and charming.

Kathleen Carroll of the New York Daily News gave the film two-and-a-half stars, remarking that it " ouldn't have cost much more than a can of soup, judging from the cheesy photography and the sloppy editing. But for someone who is just getting his feet wet in the movie business, writer-director Jonathan Kaufer displays flashes of wit that make this romantic comedy about the mating game seem quite lovable at times."
