= Art Marcum and Matt Holloway =

American screenwriters

- Other names: Arthur Marcum; Matthew Holloway
- Occupation: Screenwriters
- Years active: 2004–present
- Notable work: Kraven the Hunter; Punisher: War Zone; Uncharted

Art Marcum and Matt Holloway are an American screenwriting duo, best known for writing the scripts of movies like Iron Man and Punisher: War Zone.

== Career ==
In 2008, Marcum and Holloway wrote the script of Marvel Studios' superhero film Iron Man, which was directed by Jon Favreau and released on May 2, 2008, by Paramount Pictures. The duo also wrote the script for the action film Punisher: War Zone, directed by Lexi Alexander and released on December 5, 2008, by Lionsgate. They were hired by Paramount to co-write a script with John Fusco for the 2014 Teenage Mutant Ninja Turtles film, but their script was ultimately never used. In 2019, they were hired by Sony to write the script for the adventure film Uncharted, directed by Ruben Fleischer. In 2020, they scripted the Sony Marvel film Kraven the Hunter.

== Filmography ==
=== Film ===
Year	Title	Writers	Executive Producers	Director
2004	Shadow of Fear	Yes	No	Rich Cowan
2008	Iron Man	Yes	No	Jon Favreau
2008	Punisher: War Zone	Yes	No	Lexi Alexander
2017	Transformers: The Last Knight	Yes	No	Michael Bay
2019	Men in Black: International	Yes	No	F. Gary Gray
2022	Uncharted	Yes	Yes	Ruben Fleischer
2022	Morbius	Uncredited	No	Daniel Esposito
2024	Kraven the Hunter	Yes	Yes	J. C. Chandor
2026	Masters of the Universe	Uncredited	No	Travis Knight

=== Television ===
Key
†	Denotes television productions that have not yet been released

Year	Title	Creators	Writers	Executive Producers
TBA	Disavowed †	Yes	Yes	Yes

== Accolades ==
At the 38th Golden Raspberry Awards, the writing duo were nominated for "Worst Screenplay" for their work on Transformers: The Last Knight. At the 45th Golden Raspberry Awards, they were also nominated in the same category for their work on Kraven The Hunter.
