= CHAOS (TV series) =

- Genre: Comedy drama
- Created by: Tom Spezialy
- Starring: Eric Close; Christina Cole; Carmen Ejogo; James Murray; Tim Blake Nelson; Freddy Rodriguez; Kurtwood Smith
- Composer: David Schwartz
- Country of origin: United States
- Original language: English
- No. of seasons: 1
- No. of episodes: 13

Production
- Executive producers: Tom Spezialy; Brett Ratner; Martha Haight
- Production locations: Vancouver, British Columbia, Canada
- Running time: 42 minutes
- Production companies: Rat Entertainment; Certified Pulp; CBS Television Studios; 20th Century Fox Television

Original release
- Network: CBS
- Release: April 1 – July 16, 2011

CHAOS is an American comedy drama television series that aired on CBS from April 1, 2011 to July 16, 2011. The title is an acronym for the fictitious organization called Clandestine Homeland Administration and Oversight Services.

== Premise ==
Threats to national security are investigated by a group of rogue CIA spies in the division of Clandestine Homeland Administration and Oversight Services (CHAOS), also trying to keep their jobs from being eliminated due to budget cuts. New agent Rick Martinez (Freddy Rodriguez) joins the team as an in-house mole for CIA National Clandestine Service Director H.J. Higgins (Kurtwood Smith). However, Martinez is quickly found out by the ODS (Office of Disruptive Services) team, who "turn" him for their own use.

== Cast ==
The main cast of CHAOS.

- Freddy Rodriguez as CIA Field Agent/Operative Rick Martinez
- Christina Cole as NCS Deputy Director Adele Ferrer
- Carmen Ejogo as Intelligence Officer Fay Carson
- James Murray as Field Agent/Operative Billy Collins
- Tim Blake Nelson as Field Agent/Operative Casey Malick
- Eric Close as Field Agent/Operative Michael Dorset
- Kurtwood Smith as NCS Director H. J. Higgins

== Development and production ==
In January 2010, CBS ordered production of a pilot written by Tom Spezialy. Casting announcements began in mid-February, with Freddy Rodriguez being the first actor cast. Next to come on board were James Murray and Tim Blake Nelson. Eric Close joined the cast in early March, followed by Carmen Ejogo. Finally, Stephen Rea completed the main cast in mid-March. The pilot was filmed in Los Angeles.

In late July, CBS announced that it had officially ordered 13 episodes of the series for a mid-season start. Kurtwood Smith joined the cast in November 2010, replacing Rea in the role of Director H.J. Higgins.

Starting in mid-December 2010, CHAOS film crews were spotted and the actors photographed at various set locations around Vancouver – at the Vancouver Rowing Club, in Gastown, on the rooftop of The Bay, at the Terminal City Iron Works, and at mansions in the Shaughnessy and Point Grey neighborhoods – with these locations standing in for exotic locales around the world.

On April 15, 2011, the CBS series went on hiatus after 3 episodes due to low ratings. After CHAOS was removed from CBS's schedule on April 19, filming on the remaining episodes continued in and around Vancouver until the originally scheduled completion date of May 2.

== Episodes ==
Chaos aired all 13 episodes in production code number order. The production codes in the episode table reveal the originally intended order.

No.	Title	Directed by	Written by	Original release date	Prod. code	U.S. viewers (millions)
1	"Pilot"	Brett Ratner	Tom Spezialy	April 1, 2011	1ASM79	6.53
Newbie Rick Martinez (Freddy Rodriguez) is partnered with three unruly agents who quickly learn he is a mole out to cut their jobs. But when a hostage crisis in Sudan materializes, Rick joins the team to aid in the rescue.
2	"Core Fortitude"	David Straiton	Tom Spezialy	June 18, 2011	1ASM01	3.86
When Rick's new team goes against orders to apprehend an arms dealer, Rick must decide if he can trust them or if he should report their unauthorized activities to the CIA director.
3	"Eaten by Wolves"	Bryan Spicer	Katie Ford	June 4, 2011	1ASM02	3.12
The agents head to Russia pretending to be tourists looking for brides, but are really trying to find a scientist selling nuclear materials. When Martinez becomes entangled with one of the women (Winter Ave Zoli), his cover story starts to unravel.
4	"Song of the North"	Ron Underwood	Jace Richdale	April 8, 2011	1ASM03	5.73
When a North Korean diplomat embarrasses himself in front of the UN, Rick agrees to have the CIA orchestrate his defection. But when he demands that they also smuggle his family out of the Communist country, the CHAOS agents pose as anti-capitalism entrants in the Pyongyang Film Festival to accomplish the mission.
5	"Molé"	Bryan Spicer	Tom Spezialy and Bruce Zimmerman	May 28, 2011	1ASM04	3.88
The CIA offices go on lockdown when the director suspects a mole, putting a foreign operative in danger. The agents must figure out how to get the operative the support needed for a drug cartel operation already in play.
6	"Remote Control"	Fred Gerber	Katie Ford and Vivian Lee	June 11, 2011	1ASM05	3.23
The CHAOS team, in Paris to capture a terrorist, is discovered by French intelligence and forced to shut down their operation. Now the team must find a way to continue the mission without creating an international incident.
7	"Love and Rockets"	Ron Underwood	Matt Ward & David Gerken	April 15, 2011	1ASM06	5.68
The CHAOS agents pose as lawyers to infiltrate an international arms dealer's Russian compound and capture him, but when his daughters befriend Rick and Billy, the team must work around the distractions.
8	"Defending Sophia"	Fred Gerber	Chris Black & Bruce Zimmerman	June 25, 2011	1ASM07	3.24
The ODS goes in undercover as election monitors in Rukovia to help secure the legitimate election of a reformist politician who is being hunted by a Cold War era general who is the current President.
9	"Two Percent"	Jeff Melman	Chris Dingess	May 28, 2011	1ASM08	3.56
Casey's off his game when the team heads to China to extract a compromised female spy who just happens to have been his former girlfriend. The team decides to finish her assignment and continue on the trail of a major terrorist.
10	"Glory Days"	Sarah Pia Anderson	Michele Fazekas & Tara Butters	June 25, 2011	1ASM09	3.24
An ex-member of the ODS uncovers a private company trading national secrets to international terrorists, criminals and rival powers and contacts the ODS for help. The connection and source of loathing the Director has for the ODS is revealed.
11	"Deep Cover Band"	Oz Scott	Dan E. Fesman	July 2, 2011	1ASM10	2.49
The ODS goes undercover in Germany as drug dealers in the Industrial-Postmodern-Punk rock scene to extract a CIA operative who is in deep cover with a German drug ring. Complications arise when the operative fakes his death to try to escape with his lover.
12	"Mincemeat"	Ron Underwood	Ed Zuckerman	July 9, 2011	1ASM11	2.85
The ODS work to ensure that a dying hard-line Middle East President chooses his reformist and Westernized son to succeed him instead of his brutal brother. The ODS use an old trick from the WWII intelligence game to solve their problem, but things go awry when Operative Blank is involved.
13	"Proof of Life"	Jerry Levine	Chris Black & Ed Zimmerman	July 16, 2011	1ASM12	3.04
A former member of the ODS is discovered in Panama after Martinez concludes his first solo assignment. The ODS call upon the counterfeiting office to help them in an operation that makes the enemy of the U.S. Secret Service and the Treasury Department.

== Broadcast ==
CHAOS premiered on CBS on April 1, 2011, as a mid-season replacement for The Defenders.

CBS removed the series from the schedule on April 18, 2011, after airing three episodes of the 13-episode order, due to low ratings, and placed it on hiatus. The series resumed with episode 4 and episode 5 on May 28. The final episodes aired on Saturdays at 8 pm Eastern, ending on July 16, 2011.

=== International distribution ===
In Canada, the show was simsubbed on the Global Television Network. In New Zealand, the show had a late-night slot from October 4, 2013 through to the end of December on TV3.

== Reception ==
=== Critical reception ===
Metacritic assigned CHAOS a score of 50, signifying mixed or average reviews.

=== Ratings ===
The series premiered with 6.53 million viewers and a 1.1 rating in the adults 18–49 demo. The rating equaled the lowest ratings achieved by Medium and The Defenders in the same slot, also the lowest rating for any CBS drama this season.

=== Awards ===
Series star Freddy Rodriguez won an Imagen Award in the category "Best Actor/Television" from The Imagen Foundation for his role as Rick Martinez in CHAOS on August 12, 2011.
