= The Big Chill Cafe =

Big Chill Cafe

Restaurant information
- Established: 2000
- Owners: Aseem Grover & Fawzia Ahmed
- Food type: enterprise and café food
- Location: New Delhi, Delhi, India
- Other locations: Kailash Colony, Khan Market, Saket, Vasant Kunj, Connaught Place, Noida, Gurgaon
- Other information: 12:00 pm – 11:30 pm

The Big Chill Cafe is a chain of cafes located in New Delhi, the capital of India. The cafe is owned by Aseem Grover and Fawzia Ahmed. The cafe started out in 2000 with its first outlet in East of Kailash, an area in South Delhi, with Italian cuisine and an ice cream cafe. Presently, it has seven outlets, one in Kailash Colony market, the original East of Kaliash outlet was closed, three in Khan Market including the newly opened The Big Chill Cakery, one in DLF Promenade, Vasant Kunj, DLF Place, Saket, Connaught Place and one in DLF Mall of India, Noida. The newest one opened in Ardee City Mall (Sector 52, Gurgaon) making it the first one ever in Gurgaon. It is great competition towards other restaurants and cafes. It is a widely known restaurant all over Delhi and is famous for its grilled dishes, pasta, pizza, ice cream and cheesecakes.

The interior of the cafe has been designed to give a slightly retro look. The walls are adorned with framed posters of classic films like Casablanca and Psycho. The cafe attracts a fairly eclectic crowd. The cafe presently has a turnover of 14 million.
