= Michael Jackson's Thriller =

Michael Jackson's Thriller may refer to:

- Thriller (album), a 1982 album by Michael Jackson
  - "Thriller" (song), a song from the album Thriller
    - Michael Jackson's Thriller (music video), the music video for the song
  - Michael Jackson's Thriller jacket, jacket worn by Michael Jackson in the music video Michael Jackson's Thriller
  - "Thriller" (viral video), a 2007 video featuring prison inmates recreating the dance from the "Thriller" music video
- Thriller – Live, a musical featuring the music of the Jackson 5 and Michael Jackson

== See also ==
- Thriller (disambiguation)
