= Into the Night (1985 film) =

1985 film by John Landis

- Theatrical release poster
- Directed by: John Landis
- Written by: Ron Koslow
- Produced by: George Folsey Jr.; Ron Koslow
- Starring: Jeff Goldblum; Michelle Pfeiffer; Richard Farnsworth; Irene Papas; Kathryn Harrold
- Cinematography: Robert Paynter
- Edited by: Malcolm Campbell
- Music by: Ira Newborn
- Production company: Universal Pictures
- Distributed by: Universal Pictures
- Release date: February 22, 1985
- Running time: 115 minutes
- Country: United States
- Language: English
- Budget: $8 million
- Box office: $7.5 million

Into the Night is a 1985 American thriller film (Note: Sources differ as to the exact genre of the film. Roger Ebert called the film a thriller, while Vincent Canby said that the film was "a supposedly light-hearted caper comedy".) directed by John Landis, starring Jeff Goldblum and Michelle Pfeiffer. The film focuses on insomniac aerospace engineer Ed Okin (Goldblum), who is approached by jewel smuggler Diana (Pfeiffer) whose life is in danger, on the run from several international foes.

The film was a box office and critical failure, with critics noting that the large number of cameo appearances by Landis' friends and colleagues was unnecessary and distracting.

== Plot ==
Upon discovering that his wife Ellen is having an affair, aerospace engineer and depressed insomniac Ed Okin drives to LAX on his friend Herb's suggestion. There, he is surprised by a beautiful jewel smuggler, Diana, who jumps into his car and begs him to drive her away from four Iranian SAVAK agents who are chasing her. She persuades him to drive her to various locations and he becomes embroiled in her predicament. After becoming increasingly exasperated with her demands, he discovers that Diana has smuggled priceless emeralds from the Shah of Iran's treasury into the country and is being pursued by a variety of international assailants. Upon learning that it is in truth a struggle for a real estate deal, the couple strike a deal with Shaheen Parvici to secure their own safety.

Ed and Diana's caper gets increasingly out of hand, until Diana is eventually taken hostage by the thugs at the airport; here, Ed shares his ennui with the man holding a gun to Diana's head. The man shoots himself, instead. Ed and Diana are taken to a motel room by federal agents, one of whom gives them a briefcase with US$750,000 (equivalent to $2.2 million in 2025) in cash from Jack Caper, one of Diana's wealthy friends. Diana showers and Ed finally sleeps. He wakes up after a full night's rest to an empty hotel room with most of the money gone. However, when he leaves the room, Diana is waiting for him, with the money, a smile and a request for a ride to the airport.

== Cast ==
- Jeff Goldblum as Ed Okin
- Michelle Pfeiffer as Diana
- Richard Farnsworth as Jack Caper
- Irene Papas as Shaheen Parvici
- Kathryn Harrold as Christie
- Vera Miles as Joan Caper
- Clu Gulager as The Federal Agent
- Dan Aykroyd as Herb
- David Bowie as Colin Morris
- Bruce McGill as Charlie
- Stacey Pickren as Ellen Okin
- Carmen Argenziano as Stan
- Domingo Ambriz as The Taxi Driver
- Jake Steinfeld as Larry
- Art Evans as Jimmy
- Michael Zand as a SAVAK Agent
- Bruce Gramian as a SAVAK Agent
- Hadi Sadjadi as a SAVAK Agent
- Ava Cadell as Club Hostess

=== Cameo appearances ===
In addition to Landis, the film's director, appearing as one of the SAVAK agents, he invited numerous filmmakers, actors and musicians to make cameo appearances in the film:

- Jack Arnold, director of science-fiction films, including It Came from Outer Space (1953) and Creature from the Black Lagoon (1954), as the man with the nice dog in the elevator
- Rick Baker, Academy Award-winning make-up artist on An American Werewolf in London (1981), as the drug dealer
- Paul Bartel, director of low-budget films, including Eating Raoul (1982), as Beverly Wilshire Hotel doorman
- David Cronenberg, as Ed Okin's group supervisor.
- Jonathan Demme, who at the time had directed a number of lower-budget and exploitation films, as the thin federal agent with glasses
- Richard Franklin, Australian director of Roadgames (1981), as the aerospace engineer sitting next to Herb in the cafeteria
- Carl Gottlieb, who co-wrote Jaws (1975), as the large federal agent with moustache.
- Amy Heckerling, director of Fast Times at Ridgemont High (1982), as Amy, the clumsy waitress.
- Jim Henson, creator of The Muppets, as the man on the phone talking to Bernie (likely a reference to Henson's manager Bernie Brillstein, who had also executive-produced The Blues Brothers and Spies Like Us for Landis).
- Colin Higgins, who wrote Harold and Maude (1971) and directed The Best Little Whorehouse in Texas (1982), as the actor in the hostage film
- Lawrence Kasdan, writer and director of Body Heat (1981), as the police detective who interrogates Bud
- Jonathan Lynn, co-writer of Yes Minister and director of the Landis-produced Clue, as the tailor who fits the SAVAK agents
- "Blue" Lou Marini, saxophonist, as a member of the airport crowd
- Andrew Marton, film director, as a freeway driver
- Paul Mazursky, director of Bob & Carol & Ted & Alice as studio executive Bud Herman
- Carl Perkins, guitarist and songwriter Blue Suede Shoes as Hamid's henchman Mr. Williams
- Daniel Petrie, director of A Raisin in the Sun (1961), as the director of the hostage film
- Dedee Pfeiffer, actress and sister of Michelle Pfeiffer, as the hooker
- Waldo Salt, Academy Award-winning screenwriter of Midnight Cowboy (1969) and Coming Home (1978), as the derelict who informs Ed of his car having been towed
- Don Siegel, director of Invasion of the Body Snatchers (1956) and Dirty Harry (1971), as the man caught with a girl in the hotel bathroom
- Roger Vadim, writer and film director ...And God Created Woman as Monsieur Melville

Members of the production crew also had cameos:

- Wes Dawn, makeup artist, and Christopher Dunn George, camera operator, appear as LAPD cops who remind Ed of the green light on his way to the airport
- Eddy Donno, stunt coordinator, as LAPD officer
- Sue Dugan, costumer, as a freeway driver
- William B. Kaplan, sound mixer, David Sosna, assistant director, Saul Kahan, unit publicist, as grip, assistant director and publicist of the hostage film
- Robert Paynter, director of photography, as a security guard

== Production ==
The film was greenlit by Sean Daniel, president of Universal; he was the executive who had championed John Landis on National Lampoon's Animal House. The lead character of Ed Okin was conceived by Landis as an older man; Landis wanted Jack Nicholson or Gene Hackman for the part. Nicholson turned the role down and Universal vetoed Hackman, who was coming off a string of films that were not successful at the box office. Having had a hit with The Big Chill (1983), Universal told Landis to cast one of the actors from that film, which resulted in Jeff Goldblum playing Ed Okin.

Three weeks into the 60-day shoot, Landis was ordered to stand trial for involuntary manslaughter arising out of the Twilight Zone Movie shoot. Daniel told the press he thought Landis and his colleagues had been "unfairly sent to trial for what is obviously a human catastrophe, not a criminal act."

== Critical reception ==
Into The Night has a rating of 40% on Rotten Tomatoes, based on 25 critics' reviews, indicating a mixed critical reception. The critical consensus reads: "Despite its two stellar leads, Into the Night finds director John Landis indulging in far too many gimmicks in lieu of a well-rounded story." Vincent Canby in The New York Times wrote: "A little bit of Into The Night is funny, a lot of it is grotesque and all of it has the insidey manner of a movie made not for the rest of us, but for moviemakers on the Bel Air circuit who watch each other's films in their own screening rooms." He reserved praise, however, for the performances of the two leading actors: "Mr. Goldblum does little except react to the outrages of others, which he manages with a good deal of comic poise. Miss Pfeiffer, last seen as Al Pacino's cocaine-zonked wife in Scarface, is so beautiful that one is apt not to notice that she has the potential for being a fine comedienne." Variety held a similar view, writing that the "film itself tries sometimes too hard for laughs and at other times strains for shock", while also praising the performance of Jeff Goldblum, "nonetheless enjoyable as he constantly tries to figure out just what he's doing in all of this."

Some critics saw the large number of cameo appearances by Landis' friends and colleagues as unnecessary and distracting. Roger Ebert in the Chicago Sun-Times wrote: "If I had been the agent for one of the stars, like Goldblum, Michelle Pfeiffer, Richard Farnsworth, or Kathryn Harrold, I think I would have protested to the front office that Landis was engaging in cinematic autoeroticism and that my clients were getting lost in the middle of the family reunion." Time Out wrote: "The casting of innumerable major film-makers in small roles seems an unnecessary bit of elbow-jogging, but David Bowie makes an excellent contribution as an English hit man, and the two leading players are excellent: Pfeiffer in particular takes the sort of glamorous yet preposterous part that generally defeats even the best actress and somehow contrives to make it credible every inch of the way."

Despite negative reviews, John Landis is very pleased with the movie: "Into the Night was my first box-office failure, and that was quite surprising to me, because I hadn't done anything different. It was dark. And that's another thing; critics don't like it when you fuck with genre. It's the opposite of high concept. High concept is when you can explain [the movie] in one sentence, but when things get muddled, they're confused. I like Into the Night.; It's got a wonderful cast."

Into The Night won the Special Jury Prize at the 1985 Festival du Film Policier de Cognac.

== Soundtrack ==
The score for Into the Night was written by Ira Newborn (tracks "Enter Shaheen" and "Century City Chase"). Newborn also composed two new songs for the film soundtrack, "Into the Night" and "My Lucille" (both performed by blues singer B. B. King) and also arranged the classic song "In the Midnight Hour". The vinyl edition of this soundtrack included two songs composed by Ira Newborn, which are not included on the film soundtrack: "Don't Make Me Sorry" (co-written by Joe Esposito) performed by Patti La Belle and "Keep It Light" (co-written by Reginald "Sonny" Burke) performed by Thelma Houston. The official edition of the soundtrack also includes the songs "Let's Get It On" performed by Marvin Gaye (who was murdered by his father Marvin Gaye Sr. the previous year), and "I Can't Help Myself (Sugar Pie Honey Bunch)" performed by the Four Tops, both of which appeared during the film. No CD of this soundtrack has been issued, but all songs performed by B.B. King on the film soundtrack are available on Classic B. B. King album (from The Universal Masters Collection). The short documentary B.B. King: Into the Night was directed by Landis and Jeffrey A. Okun to promote the film and soundtrack.

On the vinyl edition, John Landis quotes about the film soundtrack:

I presented Ira Newborn with the problem, compose a motion picture score to feature a particular player and not compromise his unique talents or integrity of the movie. The film is Into the Night, the player, B.B. King.

Track listing

Side one

1. "Into the Night" (B. B. King)
2. "My Lucille" (B. B. King)
3. "In the Midnight Hour" (B. B. King)
4. "Enter Shaheen" (Ira Newborn)
5. "Century City Chase" (Ira Newborn)

Side two

1. "Don't Make Me Sorry" (Patti LaBelle)
2. "Keep It Light" (Thelma Houston)
3. "Let's Get It On" (Marvin Gaye)
4. "I Can't Help Myself (Sugar Pie Honey Bunch)" (Four Tops)
