= Tom Spezialy =

American television producer, writer, and director

- Born: Anchorage, Alaska
- Education: University of Southern California
- Occupations: Screenwriter, Producer
- Notable work: Desperate Housewives; The Leftovers; Blade Runner 2099

Tom Spezialy is an American television producer and screenwriter. He is best known for executive producing and writing for the television series The Leftovers, Reaper, and Desperate Housewives. His work has been recognized by the Primetime Emmys, Golden Globe Awards, WGA Awards, and Peabody Awards.

== Early life ==
Spezialy is a native of Anchorage, Alaska, and a graduate from the University of Southern California's School of Cinematic Arts.

== Career ==
Spezialy began his career in 1989 writing for comedy television. In addition to writing and producing for shows such as Parker Lewis Can't Lose, Jack & Jill, and Ed, he also co-developed the series Weird Science.

During the 2004–2005 television season, Spezialy became known as executive producer and writer for Desperate Housewives, a genre-defying show both critically and commercially acclaimed. The series was nominated for multiple Primetime Emmy awards during his tenure, including Outstanding Comedy Series, and it received the Golden Globe for Best Television Series - Musical or Comedy in both 2005 and 2006.

In 2007, Spezialy continued his work in comedic television when he joined the CW's devil-centered comedy, Reaper, as executive producer and writer, the first season of which generated exceptional critical acclaim. Following that, in 2011, Spezialy created and served as an executive producer on the CBS comedy-drama television series CHAOS.

Not limited to a singular genre, Spezialy's work in the drama space includes writing for series such as WGN's Manhattan and Hulu's Castle Rock. In addition, he developed for television and penned the pilot for the horror-comedy Ash vs Evil Dead on Starz.

Spezialy served as writer and executive producer for the highly acclaimed The Leftovers at HBO, which received a Peabody Award. The second and third seasons received a 94% and 99% rating on Rotten Tomatoes, respectively, and the critics' consensus complimented the show's "reliably ambitious storytelling and outstanding performances." In Maureen Ryan's review for Variety, she wrote that the final season "is spectacular, in every sense of that word."

In 2019, Spezialy was a executive producer on the HBO limited series Watchmen, which also received widespread critical acclaim. It received 11 awards for the 72nd Primetime Emmys, the most of any show in 2020, including Outstanding Limited Series. The series also accepted the 2020 Writers Guild Award for New Series.

In 2021, Spezialy was chosen to write the feature film adaptation of Hyperion, Dan Simmons' science fiction novel, which was set up at Warner Bros. Studios.

Most recently, Spezialy had a overall deal at Amazon Studios, during which he joined the Sony's Spider-Man Universe series Silk and worked as writer/executive producer for the upcoming series, Blade Runner 2099, which is set to premiere on November 25, 2026.

== Filmography ==
Key
†	Denotes television productions that have not yet been released

Year	Title	Creator	Writer	Executive producer	Notes
1988	My Sister Sam	No	Yes	No	
1990	City	No	Yes	No	
1990–93	Parker Lewis Can't Lose	No	Yes	Producer	Also story editor
1994–98	Weird Science	Developer	Yes	Co-executive	
1997	Players	No	Yes	Consulting	
1998–99	Veronica's Closet	No	Yes	Co-executive	
1999–2000	Get Real	No	Yes	Co-executive	
2001	Jack & Jill	No	Yes	Co-executive	
2001–02	Ed	No	Yes	Co-executive	
2003	Dead Like Me	No	Yes	Yes	
2003–04	The District	No	Yes	Co-executive	
2004–10	Desperate Housewives	No	Yes	Yes	
2007–09	Reaper	No	Yes	Yes	
2010	Chuck	No	No	Consulting	
2010	Human Target	Story	No	No	
2011	CHAOS	Yes	Yes	Yes	
2013	Zero Hour	No	Yes	Consulting	
2014	Manhattan	No	Yes	Consulting	
2015	Ash vs Evil Dead	Developer	Yes	No	
2015–17	The Leftovers	No	Yes	Yes	
2018	Castle Rock	No	No	Consulting	
2019	Watchmen	No	No	Yes	
2026	Blade Runner 2099 †	No	Yes	Yes	
TBA	Disavowed †	No	TBA	Yes	
