= Leslie Belzberg =

Canadian film and TV producer (born 1953)

- Born: April 5, 1953 (age 71); Calgary, Alberta, Canada
- Occupation(s): film TV producer

Leslie Belzberg is a Canadian film and TV producer. She is best known for her collaborations with director John Landis.

Born in Calgary, Alberta, Canada, Belzberg graduated from York University in Toronto with a degree in English literature and contemporary drama.

Belzberg formally entered the film industry when George Folsey Jr. hired her to work with him and John Landis on Trading Places.

== Significant collaborations ==
=== With John Landis ===
Leslie Belzberg produced ten films directed by Landis (all Landis' films from Into the Night to Susan's Plan) and four TV series in which Landis participated (including The Lost World and Honey, I Shrunk the Kids: The TV Show). Belzberg was George Folsey assistant during filming Trading Places, she also was Blues Brothers 2000 executive music producer. She won - along with Landis - CableACE Awards for Dream on series and appeared in The Making of "Blues Brothers 2000" as herself.

== Selected filmography ==
As producer

- Susan's Plan (1998)
- Blues Brothers 2000 (1998)
- The Stupids (1996)
- Beverly Hills Cop III (1994)
- Innocent Blood (1992)
- Oscar (1991)
- Coming to America (1988)
- Three Amigos (1986)
- Spies Like Us (1985)
- Into the Night (1985)
