= John Landis =

American filmmaker and actor (born 1950)

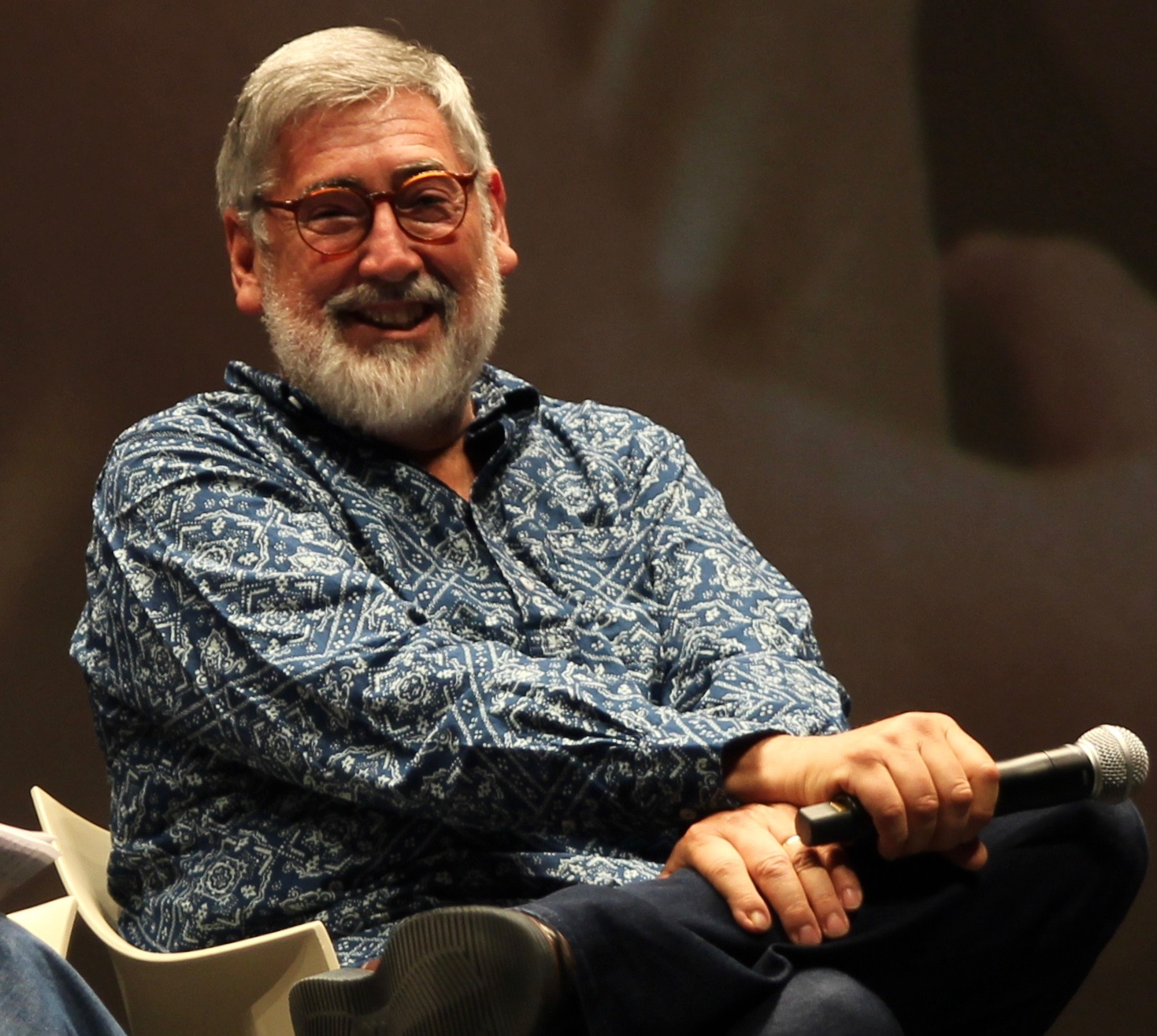
- Landis at the 2022 Cinema Ritrovato Festival in Italy
- Born: August 3, 1950 (age 76); Chicago, Illinois, U.S.
- Occupations: Film director; producer; screenwriter; actor
- Years active: 1969–present
- Spouse: Deborah Nadoolman (m. 1980)
- Children: 2, including Max

Signature
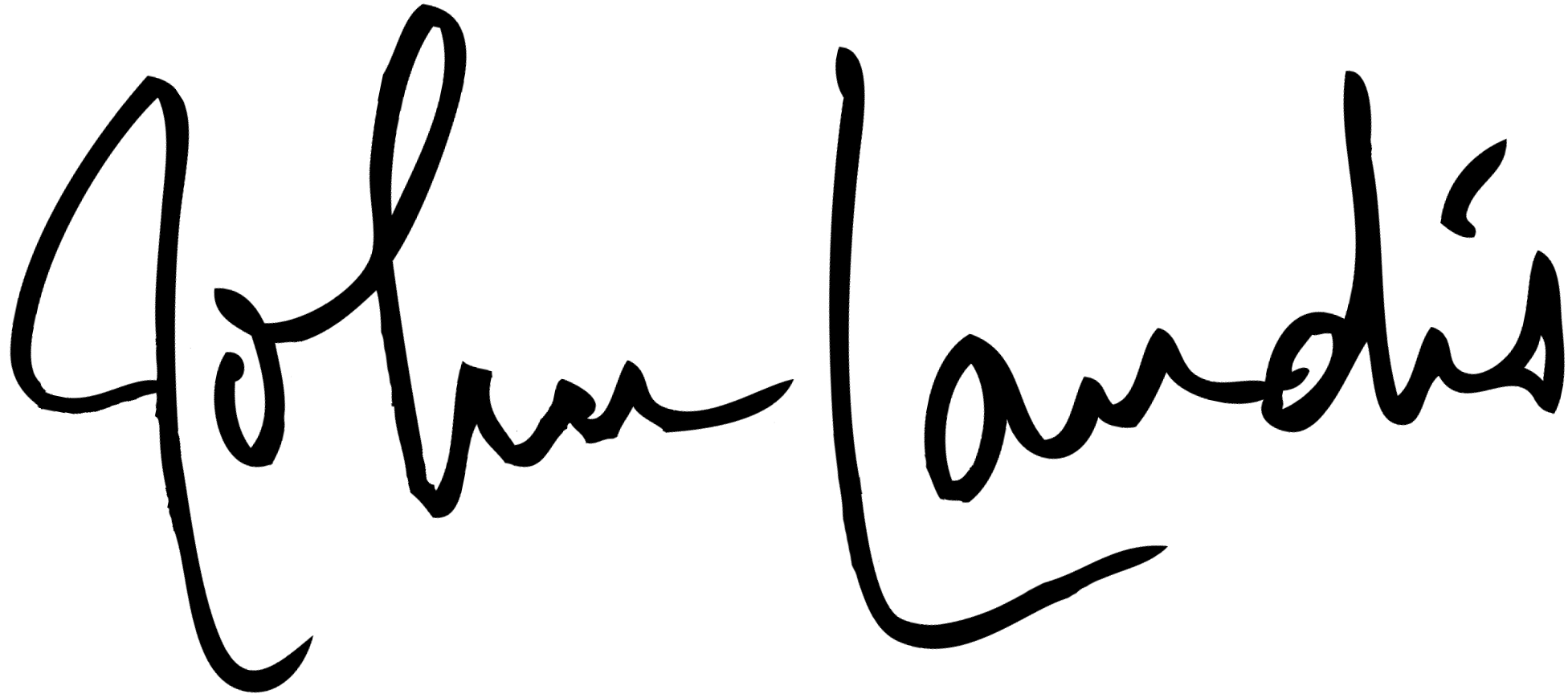

John Landis (born August 3, 1950) is an American filmmaker and actor. He is best known for directing comedy films such as The Kentucky Fried Movie (1977), National Lampoon's Animal House (1978), The Blues Brothers (1980), Trading Places (1983), Three Amigos (1986), Coming to America (1988), and Beverly Hills Cop III (1994), as well as horror films such as An American Werewolf in London (1981), Twilight Zone: The Movie (1983), and Innocent Blood (1992). He also directed the music videos for Michael Jackson's "Thriller" (1983) and "Black or White" (1991).

Landis later ventured into television work, including the series Dream On (1990), Weird Science (1994), and Sliders (1995). He also directed several episodes of the 2000s horror anthology series Masters of Horror and Fear Itself, as well as commercials for DirecTV, Taco Bell, Coca-Cola, Pepsi, Kellogg's, and Disney. In 2008, Landis won an Emmy Award for the documentary Mr. Warmth: The Don Rickles Project (2007).

In 1982, Landis became the subject of controversy when three actors, including two children, died on set while filming his segment of Twilight Zone: The Movie (1983). Landis, as well as several other parties, were subsequently tried and acquitted for involuntary manslaughter, but the incident had long-lasting effects on film industry practices.

Landis is the father of filmmaker Max Landis.

== Early life ==
Landis was born into a Jewish American family in Chicago, Illinois, the son of Shirley Levine (née Magaziner) and Marshall Landis, an interior designer and decorator. Landis and his parents relocated to Los Angeles when he was four months old. Though spending his childhood in California, Landis still refers to Chicago as his home town; he is a fan of the Chicago White Sox baseball team.

When Landis was a young boy, he watched The 7th Voyage of Sinbad, which inspired him to become a director:

I had complete suspension of disbelief—really, I was eight years old and it transported me. I was on that beach running from that dragon, fighting that Cyclops. It just really dazzled me, and I bought it completely. And so, I actually sat through it twice and when I got home, I asked my mom, "Who does that? Who makes the movie?"

== Career ==
=== Early ===
Landis began his film career working as a mailboy at 20th Century-Fox. He worked as a "go-fer" and then as an assistant director during filming Metro-Goldwyn-Mayer's Kelly's Heroes in Yugoslavia in 1969; he replaced the film's original assistant director, who became ill and was sent home. During that time, Landis became acquainted with actors Don Rickles and Donald Sutherland, both of whom later worked in his films. Following Kelly's Heroes, Landis worked on several films that were shot in Europe (especially in Italy and the United Kingdom), including Once Upon a Time in the West, El Condor, and A Town Called Bastard (or A Town Called Hell). Landis also worked as a stunt double.

I worked on some [pirate] movies, all kind of movies. French foreign movies. I worked on a movie called Red Sun where Toshiro Mifune kills me, puts a sword through me. ... I worked as a stunt guy. I worked as a dialogue coach. I worked as an actor. I worked as a production assistant.

Aged 21, Landis made his directorial debut with Schlock. The film, which he also wrote and in which he appeared, is a tribute to monster movies. The gorilla suit for the film was made by Rick Baker—the beginning of a long-term collaboration between Landis and Baker. Though completed in 1971, Schlock was not released until 1973 after it caught the attention of Johnny Carson. A fan of the film, Carson invited Landis on The Tonight Show and showed clips to help promote it. Schlock has since gained a cult following, but Landis has described the film as "terrible".

Landis was hired by Eon Productions to write a screen treatment for The Spy Who Loved Me, but his screenplay of James Bond foiling a kidnapping of the Pope in Latin America was rejected by Albert R. Broccoli for satirizing the Catholic Church. Landis was then hired to direct The Kentucky Fried Movie after David Zucker saw his Tonight Show appearance. The film was inspired by the satirical sketch comedy of shows like Monty Python, Free the Army, The National Lampoon Radio Hour, and Saturday Night Live. It is notable for being the first film written by the Zucker, Abrahams and Zucker team, who later had success with Airplane! and The Naked Gun trilogy.

=== 1978–1981 ===
Sean Daniel, an assistant to Universal executive Thom Mount, saw The Kentucky Fried Movie and recommended Landis to direct Animal House based on that. Landis says of the screenplay, "It was really literally one of the funniest things I ever read. It had a nasty edge like National Lampoon. I told him it was wonderful, extremely smart, and funny, but everyone's a pig for one thing." While Animal House received mixed reviews, it was a massive financial success, earning over $120 million at the domestic box office, making it the highest-grossing comedy film of its time. Its success started the "gross-out" film genre, which became one of Hollywood's staples. It also featured the screen debuts of John Belushi, Karen Allen, and Kevin Bacon.

In 1980, Landis co-wrote and directed The Blues Brothers, a comedy starring John Belushi and Dan Aykroyd. It featured musical numbers by rhythm and blues and soul legends James Brown, Cab Calloway, Aretha Franklin, Ray Charles, and John Lee Hooker. It was, at the time, one of the most expensive films ever made, costing almost $30 million (for comparison, Steven Spielberg's contemporary film 1941 cost $35 million). Spielberg and Landis reportedly engaged in a rivalry, the goal of which was to make the more expensive film. The rivalry might have been a friendly one, as Spielberg makes a cameo appearance in Blues Brothers (as the unnamed desk clerk near the end) and Landis had made a cameo in 1941 as a messenger.

In 1981, Landis wrote and directed another cult-status film, the comedy-horror An American Werewolf in London. It was perhaps Landis' most personal project; he had been planning to make it since 1969, while in Yugoslavia working on Kelly's Heroes. It was another commercial success for Landis and inspired studios to put comedic elements in their horror films.

=== Twilight Zone deaths and legal action against Landis ===
On July 23, 1982, during the filming of Twilight Zone: The Movie, actor Vic Morrow and child actors Myca Dinh Le (age 7) and Renee Shin-Yi Chen (age 6) were killed in an accident involving an out-of-control helicopter. The three were caught under the aircraft when it crashed, and Morrow and one child were decapitated.

In June 1983, Landis, associate producer George Folsey Jr., production manager Dan Allingham, head of special effects Paul Stewart, and helicopter pilot Dorcey Wingo were charged with involuntary manslaughter. In December, Morrow's daughters Jennifer Jason Leigh and Carrie Morrow also sued Landis, Wingo, Warner Bros. Studios, and others for negligence and wrongful death, resulting in Warner Bros. settling their case out of court, awarding $850,000 to each party. Following the accident, Spielberg ended his friendship with Landis.

In October 1984, the National Transportation Safety Board reported:

The probable cause of the accident was the detonation of debris-laden, high-temperature special effects explosions too near a low-flying helicopter, leading to foreign object damage to one rotor blade and delamination due to heat to the other rotor blade, the separation of the helicopter's tail rotor assembly, and the uncontrolled descent of the helicopter. The proximity of the helicopter to the special effects explosions was due to the failure to establish direct communications and coordination between the pilot, who was in command of the helicopter operation, and the film director, who was in charge of the filming operation.

The lawsuit finally proceeded in 1985. Landis insisted that the deaths of Morrow, Le, and Chen were the result of an accident. However, camera operators filming the scene testified to Landis being a very imperious director, and a "yeller and screamer" on set. During a take three hours before the incident, Wingo (a veteran of the Vietnam War) told Landis that the fireballs were too large and too close to the helicopter, to which Landis responded, "You ain't seen nothing yet." With special effects explosions blasting around them, the helicopter descended over Morrow, Le, and Chen. Witnesses testified that Landis was still shouting for the helicopter to fly "Lower! Lower!" moments before it crashed.

The prosecutors demonstrated that Landis was reckless and had not warned the parents, cast, or crew of the children and Morrow's proximity to explosives, or of limitations on their working hours. He admitted that he had violated California law regulating the employment of children by using the children after hours, and conceded that that was wrong, but still denied culpability. Metallurgist Gary Fowler testified that the heat from two explosions engulfed and delaminated the helicopter's tail rotor, causing it to fall off, and that there had been "no historical basis" for the phenomenon.

Deputy District Attorney Lea Purwin D'Agostino stated that Landis was acting "cool", "slippery", and "glib" during the trial, and that his testimony contained inconsistencies. After a 10-month jury trial that took place in 1986 and 1987, Landis—represented by criminal defense attorneys Harland Braun and James F. Neal—and the other crew members were acquitted of the charges.

Both Le's and Chen's parents later filed civil suits against Landis and other defendants and eventually settled out of court with the studio for $2 million per family. In 1988, Landis was reprimanded by the Directors Guild of America for unprofessional conduct on the set of the film and the California Labor Commission fined him $5,000 for violating child labor laws. Additionally, Cal/OSHA issued 36 citations and $62,375 in fines, although this amount was later reduced to $1,350. Warner Bros. vice president John Silvia also spearheaded a committee to create new safety standards for the film industry.

During an interview with journalist Giulia D'Agnolo Vallan, Landis said, "When you read about the accident, they say we were blowing up huts—which we weren't—and that debris hit the tail rotor of the helicopter—which it didn't. The FBI Crime Lab, who was working for the prosecution, finally figured out that the tail rotor delaminated, which is why the pilot lost control. The special effects man who made the mistake by setting off a fireball at the wrong time was never charged."

=== Subsequent film career ===
Trading Places, a Prince and the Pauper–style comedy starring Dan Aykroyd and Eddie Murphy, was filmed directly after the Twilight Zone accident. After filming ended, Landis and his family went to London. The film, a big hit at the box office (the fourth-most-popular movie of 1983) did well enough for Landis' image and career to improve, along with his involvement with Michael Jackson's "Thriller".

Next, Landis directed Into the Night, starring Jeff Goldblum, Michelle Pfeiffer, and David Bowie, and appeared in the film, which was inspired by Hitchcock productions, as an Iranian hitman. To promote the film, Landis collaborated with Jeff Okun to direct a documentary film called B.B. King "Into the Night".

His next film, Spies Like Us (starring co-writer Dan Aykroyd and Chevy Chase), was an homage to the Road to ... films of Bob Hope and Bing Crosby. It was the 10th-most-popular movie of 1985. Hope made a cameo in the Landis film, portraying himself.

In 1986, Landis directed Three Amigos, which featured Chevy Chase, Martin Short, and Steve Martin. He then co-directed and produced the 1987 satirical comedy film Amazon Women on the Moon, which parodies the experience of watching low-budget films on late-night television.

Landis next directed the 1988 Eddie Murphy film Coming to America, which was hugely successful, becoming the third-most-popular movie of 1988 at the U.S. box office. It was also the subject of Buchwald v. Paramount, a civil suit filed by Art Buchwald in 1990 against the film's producers. Buchwald claimed that the concept for the film had been stolen from a 1982 script that Paramount optioned from Buchwald, and won the breach of contract action.

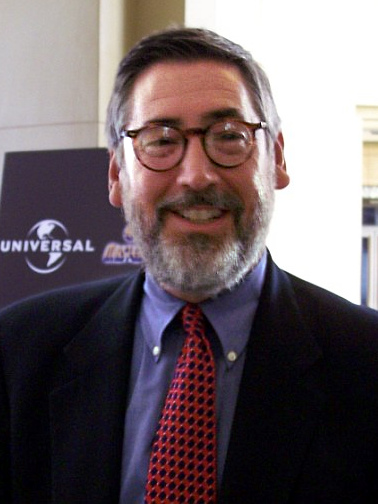
Landis in 2006

In 1991, Landis directed Sylvester Stallone in Oscar, based on a Claude Magnier stage play. Oscar recreates a 1930s-era film, including the gestures along with bit acts and with some slapstick, as an homage to old Hollywood films. In 1992, Landis directed Innocent Blood, a horror-crime film. In 1994, Landis directed Eddie Murphy in Beverly Hills Cop III, their third collaboration following Trading Places and Coming to America. In 1996, he directed The Stupids and then returned to Universal to direct Blues Brothers 2000 in 1998 with John Goodman, and for the fifth time in a Landis film, Dan Aykroyd, who also appeared in Landis' film Susan's Plan, released that same year. None of the above six films scored well with either critics or audiences.

Burke and Hare was released in 2010, as Landis' first theatrical release in 12 years.

In August 2011, Landis said he would return to horror and would be writing a new film. He was the executive producer on the comedy horror film Some Guy Who Kills People.

=== Music videos ===
Landis has directed several music videos. He was approached by Michael Jackson to make a video for his song "Thriller". The resulting video significantly impacted MTV and the concept of music videos; it has won numerous awards, including the Video Vanguard Award for The Greatest Video in the History of the World. In 2009 (months before Jackson died), Landis sued the Jackson estate in a dispute over royalties for the video; he claimed to be owed at least four years' worth of royalties.

In 1991, Landis collaborated again with Michael Jackson on the music video for the song "Black or White".

=== Television ===
Landis has been active in television as the executive producer (and often director) of the series Dream On (1990), Weird Science (1994), Sliders (1995), Honey, I Shrunk the Kids: The TV Show (1997), Campus Cops (1995), The Lost World (1998), Masters of Horror, and various episodes of Psych. He also made commercials for DirecTV, Taco Bell, Coca-Cola, Pepsi, Kellogg's, and Disney. In 2011 he made an appearance in Reece Shearsmith and Steve Pemberton's television series Psychoville. In June 2020, Landis signed on to direct and executive produce the streaming series Superhero Kindergarten.

=== Documentaries ===
Landis made his first documentary, Coming Soon, in 1982; it was only released on VHS. In 1983, he worked on the 45-minute documentary Making Michael Jackson's Thriller, which aired on MTV and Showtime and was simultaneously released on home video, which became the biggest selling home video release of the time. Next, he co-directed B.B. King "Into the Night" (1985) and in 2002 directed Where Are They Now?: A Delta Alumni Update, which can be seen as a part of the Animal House DVD extras. Initially, his documentaries were only made to promote his feature films. Later in his career he became more serious about the oeuvre and made Slasher (2004), Mr. Warmth: The Don Rickles Project (2007) and Starz Inside: Ladies or Gentlemen (2009) for television. Landis won a 2008 Emmy Award for Mr. Warmth. In 2023, he appeared in the Spanish documentary The Man Who Saw Frankenstein Cry, which covered the career of Spanish movie director Paul Naschy. Landis was friends with Christopher Lee and he appeared in the documentary The Life and Deaths of Christopher Lee (2024).

== Recurring motifs ==
One of Landis' trademarks is to insert references to a fictional film called See You Next Wednesday in movies that he directs. The line derives from Stanley Kubrick's 2001: A Space Odyssey in which Frank Poole's parents end their video to him. The line is also mentioned in the opening scene of Michael Jackson's Thriller, when the police decode a message from Jackson's were-cat character. The phrase is featured in An American Werewolf in London as a title of a movie listed on a marquee.

Several of Landis' films break the fourth wall. Many of his films also feature references to the Oldsmobile. It appeared in Animal House (Mayor Carmine DePasto owns an Oldsmobile dealership and allows his vehicles to be used during the parade), Trading Places (Duke & Duke's limousine), Thriller (Jackson's car), Twilight Zone: The Movie (during Prologue), Into the Night (Diana's brother's car), The Blues Brothers (while driving through the mall, Elwood said: "The new Oldsmobiles are in early this year"), Three Amigos (during scenes in Santo Poco), and Oscar. Additionally, in many Landis films, there are also car crashes.

Another motif is that many of his characters go about their life while movies/cartoons are visibly played in the background—either on television or sound from the TV set—which serves as commentary for their actions during scenes. In the television version of Trading Places, Clarence Beeks drugs a security guard and steals the crop report while Sunset Boulevard is showing; in Into the Night in Hamid's apartment, the movie Abbott and Costello Meet Frankenstein is playing while Ed is looking for Diana and later, when Mr. Morris fighting with Mr. Williams. In Spies Like Us, Emmit Fitzhume is watching the musical She's Working Her Way Through College and later, during a press conference, clips from the movie are showing on TV. In Innocent Blood in several scenes, Phantom of the Rue Morgue is showing on the television during the morgue scenes with Macielli.

== Archives ==
Landis' moving image collection is held at the Academy Film Archive. The film material at the Archive is complemented by photographs, artwork and posters found in Landis' papers at the Academy's Margaret Herrick Library.

== Personal life ==
Landis is married to Deborah Nadoolman, a costume designer. They have two children, including Max. In a BBC Radio interview, he stated that he is an atheist. The family lives in Beverly Hills, California. They had purchased Rock Hudson's estate in Beverly Crest.

In 2009, Landis signed a petition in support of director Roman Polanski, who had been detained while traveling to a film festival in relation to his 1977 sexual abuse charges. The petition argued that the detention would undermine the tradition of film festivals as a place for works to be shown "freely and safely", and that arresting filmmakers traveling to neutral countries could open the door "for actions of which no-one can know the effects."

== Awards ==
In 2023, Landis was the 4th recipient of the Vincent Price Award, created to celebrate "Vincent Price's unique artistic and iconic legacy by honoring an artist whose work has achieved equally iconic status in the horror/fantasy genres." The award celebrated Landis' work in An American Werewolf in London and Michael Jackson's Thriller (also featuring Vincent Price). The award was presented by Victoria Price and festival founder Miles Flanagan, as part of Hollywood Horrorfest, fundraising for the Vincent Price Art Museum.

== Filmography ==
=== Film ===
Year	Title	Director	Writer	Producer	Notes
1973	Schlock	Yes	Yes	No	
1977	The Kentucky Fried Movie	Yes	No	No	
1978	Animal House	Yes	No	No	a.k.a. National Lampoon's Animal House
1980	The Blues Brothers	Yes	Yes	No	
1981	An American Werewolf in London	Yes	Yes	No	
1982	Coming Soon	Yes	Yes	Yes	Documentary
1983	Trading Places	Yes	No	No	
1983	Twilight Zone: The Movie	Yes	Yes	Yes	Segments "Prologue" and "Time Out"
1985	Into the Night	Yes	No	No	
1985	Spies Like Us	Yes	No	No	
1985	Clue	No	Story	Executive	
1986	¡Three Amigos!	Yes	No	No	
1987	Amazon Women on the Moon	Yes	No	Executive	Segments "Mondo Condo", "Hospital", "Blacks Without Soul" and "Video Date"
1988	Coming to America	Yes	No	No	
1991	Oscar	Yes	No	No	
1992	Innocent Blood	Yes	No	No	
1994	Beverly Hills Cop III	Yes	No	No	
1996	The Stupids	Yes	No	No	
1998	Blues Brothers 2000	Yes	Yes	Yes	
1998	Susan's Plan	Yes	Yes	Yes	
2010	Burke and Hare	Yes	No	No	

Executive producer

- The Lost World (1998)
- Some Guy Who Kills People (2012)
- I Hate Kids (2019)

Acting roles

Year	Title	Role	Notes
1970	Kelly's Heroes	Sister Rosa Stigmata	Uncredited; Also production assistant
1973	Battle for the Planet of the Apes	Jake's Friend	
1973	Schlock	Schlock	
1975	Death Race 2000	Mechanic	
1977	The Kentucky Fried Movie	TV Technician	Uncredited
1979	The Muppet Movie	Grover	Uncredited, puppetry only in "Rainbow Connection" finale scene
1979	1941	Mizerany	
1980	The Blues Brothers	Trooper La Fong	
1981	An American Werewolf in London	Man Being Smashed Into Window	Uncredited
1982	Eating Raoul	Man who bumps into Mary	Uncredited
1983	Trading Places	Man with briefcase	Uncredited
1984	The Muppets Take Manhattan	Leonard Winesop	
1985	Into the Night	SAVAK	
1990	Spontaneous Combustion	Radio Technician	
1990	Darkman	Physician	
1992	Sleepwalkers	Lab Technician	
1992	Body Chemistry II: The Voice of a Stranger	Dr. Edwards	
1992	Venice/Venice	Himself	
1994	The Silence of the Hams	FBI Agent	
1996	Vampirella	Astronaut #1	
1997	Laws of Deception	Judge Trevino	
1997	Mad City	Doctor	
1999	Diamonds	Gambler	
1999	Freeway II: Confessions of a Trickbaby	Judge	
2004	Surviving Eden	Doctor Levine	
2004	Spider-Man 2	Doctor	
2005	The Axe	Père copain Maxime	
2005	Torrente 3: El protector	Embajador árabe	
2007	Look	Aggravated Director	
2012	Attack of the 50 Foot Cheerleader	Professor	
2015	Wrestling Isn't Wrestling	Therapist	Short film
2015	Tales of Halloween	Jebediah Rex	Segment "The Ransom of Rusty Rex"

=== Television ===
Year	Title	Director	Producer	Writer	Notes
1976	Holmes & Yo-Yo	No	No	Story	Episode: "Key Witness"
1985	Disneyland's 30th Anniversary Celebration	Yes	No	No	TV documentary
1985	George Burns Comedy Week	Yes	No	No	Episode: "Disaster at Buzz Creek"
1990–1996	Dream On	Yes	Executive	No	Directed 17 episodes
1990	Disneyland's 35th Anniversary Celebration	Yes	No	No	TV documentary
1994	Weird Science	No	Executive	No	
1995	Sliders	No	Executive	No	
1996	Campus Cops	Yes	Executive	No	Directed 2 episodes: "Muskrat Ramble", "3,001"
1997–1999	Honey, I Shrunk the Kids: The TV Show	Yes	Executive	No	Directed episode: "Honey, Name That Tune"
1999–2002	The Lost World	No	Executive	No	
2002	The Kronenberg Chronicles	Yes	Executive	No	Unaired pilot
2004	Slasher	Yes	No	No	Television documentary
2005–2006	Masters of Horror	Yes	No	Yes	Directed and co-wrote episode: "Deer Woman"; Directed episode: "Family"
2007	Mr. Warmth: The Don Rickles Project	Yes	Yes	No	TV documentary
2007–2008	Psych	Yes	No	No	3 episodes
2008	Fear Itself	Yes	No	No	Episode: "In Sickness and in Health"
2008	Starz Inside: Ladies or Gentlemen	No	Executive	No	TV documentary
2011	Wendy Liebman: Taller on TV	No	Yes	No	Stand-up special
2012	Franklin & Bash	Yes	No	No	Episode: "Voir Dire"
2021	Superhero Kindergarten	Yes	Executive	No	26 episodes

Acting roles

Year	Title	Role	Notes
1974	The Six Million Dollar Man	Michael	Episode: "The Pal-Mir Escort"
1990	Psycho IV: The Beginning	Mike Calveccio	TV movie
1991–1994	Dream On	Herb	2 episodes: "Futile Attraction", "Where There's Smoke, You're Fired"
1994	The Stand	Russ Dorr	Episode: "The Stand"
2011	Psychoville	Director	Episode: "Dinner Party"

=== Music videos ===
Year	Title	Artist
1983	Thriller	Michael Jackson
1985	"My Lucille"	B.B. King
1985	B.B. King: Into the Night	B.B. King
1985	"In the Midnight Hour"	B.B. King
1986	"Spies Like Us"	Paul McCartney
1991	"Black or White"	Michael Jackson

=== Unrealized projects ===
Year	Title and description	Ref(s)
1960s	See You Next Wednesday, a fictional "musical autobiography" of himself if he died at 19 years old	
1960s	Sex and Violence, an erotic porno-comedy co-written with Jim O'Rourke	
1970s	Teenage Vampire, a vampire film set in 1950s Ohio	
1970s	A film adaptation of H. G. Wells' novel The Island of Doctor Moreau	
1970s	A film adaptation of Mark Twain's novel A Connecticut Yankee in King Arthur's Court written by Waldo Salt	
1970s	The Spy Who Loved Me	
1970s	Close Encounters of the Third Kind, retitled from Project Bluebook	
1970s	The Thing	
1970s	Fatal Voyage, a film co-written with John Barry described as an "Alien ripped off script"	
1970s	Say Ahhh, a TV pilot	
1970s	Big Trouble, a fantasy adventure film co-written with Douglas Kenney and Harold Ramis set partially on another planet	
1970s	A Chorus Line	
1970s	The Incredible Shrinking Woman	
1970s	Burger City, a TV pilot co-written with Paula Levenback and Wendy Riche set inside a hamburger restaurant	
1970s	A film adaptation of Sir Arthur Conan Doyle's novel The Lost World written by Richard Matheson	
1980s	Barnum, a biopic of circus showman P. T. Barnum written by Bill Lancaster starring John Belushi	
1980s	Dick Tracy starring Clint Eastwood	
1980s	Whereabouts, a mystery adventure written by Jim Cash and Jack Epps Jr.	
1980s	Clue	
1980s	Little Shop of Horrors	
1980s	Club Paradise	
1990s	The Lone Ranger, a film based on the eponymous character written by George MacDonald Fraser	
1990s	A remake of the 1933 film King Kong	
1990s	Sinbad, a film written by Mark Saltzman	
1990s	Red Sleep, a vampire film co-written with Mick Garris, Richard Christian Matheson and Harry Shearer set in Las Vegas	
1990s	A sequel to his film An American Werewolf in London	
1990s	An unaired TV pilot based on Thorne Smith's novel Topper, starring Tim Curry, Courteney Cox and Ben Cross	
1990s	Fastlane, a two-hour television film about people on the road with a "bitchin' car"	
1990s	Call Me a Cop, a comedy about a group of gangsters who disguise themselves as policemen	
1990s	Cast of Characters, a film written by Peter Barnes and Larry Cohen about a collection of classic literary characters coming together	
1990s	A sequel to The Stupids	
1990s	The Return of Willard, a sequel to Willard starring Bruce Davison	
1990s	Really Scary, an anthology horror film with segments directed by Landis, Guillermo del Toro, Sam Raimi and Joe Dante	
2000s	Gone, a thriller set in a haunted house	
2000s	Real Men, a comedy written by Dan O'Dowd about a small-town football game that pits homosexuals against heterosexuals	
2000s	A film adaptation of Keythe Farley and Brian Flemming's rock musical Bat Boy	
2000s	A film adaptation of Larry Coen and David Crane's one-act play Epic Proportions written by Todd Berger	
2000s	The Missionary Position, retitled from Missionary Impossible, a comedy written by Glen Brackenridge and Curtis Brien	
2000s	Show Dogs, a comedy about a homeless Jack Russell Terrier written by Mike Bender	
2000s	A film adaptation of Mike Richardson's novel Cut	
2000s	The Wolfman	
2000s	Ghoulishly Yours, William M. Gaines, a biopic of EC Comics publisher William Gaines written by Joel Eisenberg	
2000s	The Bone Orchard, a Western about Chinese vampires written by M. D. Presley starring Russell Brand and Mila Kunis	
2000s	A film adaptation of Richard Brinsley Sheridan's five-act play The Rivals starring Joseph Fiennes, Albert Finney, James Corden, Imelda Staunton and Paul Whitehouse	
2010s	Untitled Parisian monster movie co-written with Alexandre Gavras	
2010s	Untitled Shanghai-set film	
2020s	Superhero Kindergarten live-action TV series	
2020s	Untitled Superhero Kindergarten film spin-off	

Other unmade projects include a book he was working on as of 2015, a TV series adapted from an unproduced feature script that he was hoping to make as of 2016, and a Broadway show he was said to be planning as of 2023.

== Bibliography ==
- Sammon, Paul M. (September–October 1983). "TZ Interview: John Landis". The Twilight Zone Magazine. Vol. 3, no. 4. p. 29–38.
- Alberto Farina (1995). John Landis. Il Castoro. ISBN 978-88-8033-030-1
- Vallan, Giulia D'Agnolo (2008). John Landis. M Press. ISBN 1-59582-041-8.
