= List of awards and nominations received by Tim Van Patten =

Tim Van Patten is a director known for his extensive work in television and with several critically acclaimed HBO series. He has received numerous accolades including two Emmy Awards, a Peabody Awards, a Critics' Choice Award, two Directors Guild of America Awards, two Producers Guild of America Awards, and two Writers Guild of America Awards as well as nominations for three BAFTA Awards. He received two Primetime Emmy Awards for Outstanding Limited Series for the HBO limited series The Pacific (2010), and Outstanding Directing for a Drama Series for the HBO drama series Boardwalk Empire episode "To the Lost".

== Major associations ==
=== BAFTA Awards ===
Year	Category	Nominated work	Result	Ref.
British Academy Television Awards
2008	Best Drama Series	Rome	Nominated	
2011	Best International Series	Boardwalk Empire	Nominated	
2018	Best Single Drama	Black Mirror: "Hang the DJ"	Nominated	

=== Emmy Awards ===
Year	Category	Nominated work	Result	Ref.
Primetime Emmy Award
2001	Outstanding Writing for a Drama Series	The Sopranos: "Pine Barrens"	Nominated	
2001	Outstanding Directing for a Drama Series	The Sopranos: "Amour Fou"	Nominated	
2003	Outstanding Directing for a Drama Series	The Sopranos: "Whoever Did This"	Nominated	
2004	Outstanding Directing for a Drama Series	The Sopranos: "Long Term Parking"	Nominated	
2004	Outstanding Directing for a Comedy Series	Sex and the City: "An American Girl in Paris"	Nominated	
2006	Outstanding Directing for a Drama Series	The Sopranos: "Members Only"	Nominated	
2010	Outstanding Miniseries	The Pacific	Won	
2010	Outstanding Directing for a Limited Series	The Pacific: "Okinawa"	Nominated	
2011	Outstanding Drama Series	Boardwalk Empire	Nominated	
2011	Outstanding Directing for a Drama Series	Game of Thrones: "Winter Is Coming"	Nominated	
2012	Outstanding Drama Series	Boardwalk Empire	Nominated	
2012	Outstanding Directing for a Drama Series	Boardwalk Empire: "To the Lost"	Won	
2013	Outstanding Directing for a Drama Series	Boardwalk Empire: "Margate Sands"	Nominated	
2014	Outstanding Directing for a Drama Series	Boardwalk Empire: "Farewell Daddy Blues"	Nominated	
2015	Outstanding Directing for a Drama Series	Boardwalk Empire: "Eldorado"	Nominated	
New & Documentary Emmy Awards
2017	Outstanding Historical Documentary	Underfire: The Untold Story of Pfc. Tony Vaccaro	Nominated	

=== Critics' Choice Awards ===
Year	Category	Nominated work	Result	Ref.
2011	Best Limited Series or Movie	The Pacific	Won	

=== Peabody Award ===
Year	Category	Nominated work	Result	Ref.
2011	Peabody Award	The Pacific	Won	

== Guild Awards ==
=== Directors Guild of America Awards ===
Year	Category	Nominated work	Result	Ref.
2002	Outstanding Directing - Drama Series	The Sopranos: "Whoever Did This"	Nominated	
2003	Outstanding Directing - Comedy Series	Sex and the City: "Boy, Interrupted"	Won	
2004	Outstanding Directing - Comedy Series	Sex and the City: "An American Girl in Paris"	Won	
2004	Outstanding Directing - Drama Series	The Sopranos: "Long Term Parking"	Nominated	
2006	Outstanding Directing - Drama Series	The Sopranos: "The Sopranos"	Nominated	
2007	Outstanding Directing - Drama Series	The Sopranos: "Soprano Home Movies"	Nominated	
2010	Outstanding Directing - Miniseries or TV Film	The Pacific: "Okinawa"	Nominated	
2011	Outstanding Directing - Drama Series	Game of Thrones: "Winter Is Coming"	Nominated	

=== Producers Guild of America Awards ===
Year	Category	Nominated work	Result	Ref.
2011	Outstanding Producer for a Limited Series	The Pacific	Won	
2012	Outstanding Producer for a Drama Series	Boardwalk Empire	Won	

=== Writers Guild of America Awards ===
Year	Category	Nominated work	Result	Ref.
2002	Episodic Drama	The Sopranos: "Pine Barrens"	Won	
2011	Drama Series	Boardwalk Empire	Nominated	
2011	Best New Series	Boardwalk Empire	Won	

== Miscellaneous awards ==
=== Edgar Allan Poe Awards ===
- 2002 - Best Television Episode - The Sopranos: The Pine Barrens

=== Hugo Award ===
- 2012 - Best Dramatic Presentation - Game of Thrones

=== Online Film & Television Awards ===
- 2003 - Best Direction in a Drama Series - The Sopranos: Whoever Did This - nominee
- 2005 - Best Direction of a Limited Series or Movie - Into the West - winner
- 2010 - Best Direction of a Limited Series or Movie - The Pacific - winner
- 2011 - Best Direction in a Drama Series - Boardwalk Empire - nominee
- 2011 - Best Direction in a Drama Series - Game of Thrones - nominee
- 2012 - Best Direction in a Drama Series - Boardwalk Empire - nominee
- 2012 - Best Direction in a Drama Series - Game of Thrones - nominee
- 2013 - Best Direction in a Drama Series - Boardwalk Empire - nominee
- 2014 - Best Direction in a Drama Series - Boardwalk Empire - nominee
- 2020 - OFTA Hall of Fame - winner

=== GoldDerby Awards ===
- 2004 - Episode of the Year - The Sopranos: Long Term Parking
- 2010 - Episode of the Decade - The Sopranos: Pine Barrens
