= The Ivory Tower (Boardwalk Empire) =

- Boardwalk Empire episode
- Episode no.: Season 1 Episode 2
- Directed by: Tim Van Patten
- Written by: Howard Korder
- Original air date: October 24, 2010
- Running time: 53 minutes

Guest appearances
- Gretchen Mol as Gillian Darmody; Greg Antonacci as Johnny Torrio; Edoardo Ballerini as Ignacious D'Alessio; Dana Ivey as Mrs. McGarry; Peter McRobbie as Supervisor Elliot; Chris Mulkey as Senator Walter Edge; Frank Shattuck as Charlie Sheridan; Erik Weiner as Agent Sebso

Episode chronology
← Previous "Boardwalk Empire"	Next → "Broadway Limited"

"The Ivory Tower" is the second episode of the first season of the HBO television series Boardwalk Empire, which originally aired September 26, 2010. The episode was written by series creator and executive producer Terence Winter and directed by executive producer Tim Van Patten.

Nucky is visited by federal agent Nelson Van Alden, who begins to suspect that Nucky might be a bigger fish than the gangsters he has been investigating. Jimmy is forced to pay Nucky a larger sum of money as compensation for the loss of Rothstein's alcohol. Margaret is visited by Van Alden and Eli, each seeking a different side of her story as to the death of Hans Schroeder.

== Main cast ==
- Steve Buscemi as Enoch "Nucky" Thompson
- Michael Pitt as James "Jimmy" Darmody
- Kelly Macdonald as Margaret Schroeder/Thompson
- Michael Shannon as Nelson Van Alden
- Shea Whigham as Elias "Eli" Thompson
- Aleksa Palladino as Angela Darmody
- Michael Stuhlbarg as Arnold Rothstein
- Stephen Graham as Al Capone
- Vincent Piazza as Charles Luciano
- Paz de la Huerta as Lucy Danziger, Nucky's mistress
- Anthony Laciura as Edward Anselm "Eddie" Kessler, Nucky's assistant and butler.
- Paul Sparks as Mieczyslaw "Mickey Doyle" Kuzik, a bootlegger and former associate of Nucky's.
- Dabney Coleman as "Commodore" Louis Kaestner, Nucky's mentor and predecessor in Atlantic City.

== Plot ==
At Colosimo's funeral in Chicago, Capone and Torrio are questioned by reporters about the circumstances surrounding his murder. Back in Atlantic City, Nelson Van Alden, a newly minted investigator with the Bureau of Prohibition, questions Nucky about the robbery he is investigating, revealing his suspicions that Hans was framed for the crime. Nucky's refusal to cooperate with the investigation leads Van Alden to look into his activities; his report to his superiors reveals the extent to which Nucky extorts and controls every legitimate and illegitimate outfit in the city.

At Nucky's direction, Eli visits Margaret in the hospital and delivers an envelope of cash, while making a subtle threat to have her children taken into state custody unless she lies to Van Alden about her husband being involved in bootlegging. Nucky confronts Mickey in jail and explains that his operation is being turned over to the black mob headed by Albert "Chalky" White on account of Mickey proving himself too untrustworthy to handle it. Jimmy buys expensive Christmas gifts for his family with his cut from the robbery. Capone beats a reporter who tries to interview him at Torrio's club.

In New York, Luciano brings in Frankie Yale to be questioned by Rothstein about his role in Colosimo's death. Jimmy visits his mother Gillian, a middle-aged showgirl, and presents her with an expensive necklace to replace the one she had sold years earlier to support him when they were abandoned by Jimmy's father. When Jimmy shows up for work, Nucky confronts him about the robbery. Jimmy confesses his involvement and is fired on the spot, with Nucky giving him two days to come up with an additional $3,000. Rothstein telephones Nucky and demands $100,000 to cover his losses from the robbery and for the murder of one of the drivers, who happens to be his sister-in-law's nephew. Nucky refuses and threatens to have him killed if he ever returns to Atlantic City. Van Alden visits Margaret and tells her he believes her husband was not involved in the robbery, questioning her about her involvement with Nucky.

Nucky visits his political mentor, "Commodore" Louis Kaestner, who humiliates his black maid to mock the idea of women's suffrage. After Van Alden writes home to his wife, he takes a hair ribbon he had stolen from Margaret and smells it to satiate his lust for her. Margaret visits Nucky and returns the money Eli gave her. They discuss Nucky's late wife, Margaret's financial situation, her request that Nucky help her find a job to support her children and her enthusiasm for reading. Jimmy, short $500 and unable to get Capone to loan him the rest, steals the necklace from his mother and pawns it to pay Nucky back. Nucky then demonstrates the power he now holds over Jimmy by betting, and losing, the entire $3,000 in a roulette game. Elsewhere, one of Rothstein's men, alive but badly wounded, stumbles across a businessman getting sexually pleasured in his car outside Atlantic City.

== First appearances ==
- Gillian Darmody: Jimmy's mother, Angela's mother-in-law, Tommy's paternal grandmother and an acquaintance of Nucky's.
- Grey-Haired Man: Arnold Rothstein's assistant and bodyguard.
- Harlan: An African-American shoeshiner at the Ritz Carlton in Atlantic City who is also a member of the black community and connected to Deacon Cuffy.
- Carl Heely: An Irish-American little person who is also a part-time boxer and occasionally dresses up as a Leprechaun for St. Patrick's Day.
- George Baxter: A traveling salesman in Atlantic City who's also an acquaintance of Nucky.

== Production ==
The episode was written by series creator and executive producer Terence Winter and directed by executive producer Tim Van Patten. This is Van Patten's first directional episode of the series. He would go on to direct additional episodes, including "Broadway Limited", "Family Limitation" and the season finale, "A Return to Normalcy".

The story about Big Jim Colosimo's death is the one non-fictional story in The Ivory Tower. As seen in the pilot, Frankie Yale murders Jim on orders from Johnny Torrio. It was widely believed that Torrio ordered Colosimo's killing so that he and the Chicago mob could enter the lucrative bootlegging business, which Colosimo opposed out of a fervent belief that bootlegging was not worth the heat it would bring from law enforcement.

== Reception ==
=== Critical reception ===
IGN gave the episode a score of 8 out of 10, calling it "...an episode that is in some ways better than the pilot." They continued by praising Buscemi's performance as Nucky by saying: "Here, Buscemi effortlessly switches between silver-tongued politician and two-steps-ahead gangster, and in doing so eliminates any previous doubt that Nucky is not as formidable a presence as Tony Soprano."

=== Ratings ===
Ratings for "The Ivory Tower" fell to 3.329 million viewers in its original telecast. However, if the repeat-telecast that night is included, the total viewer count reaches 4.4 million.
