= Broadway Limited (Boardwalk Empire) =

- Boardwalk Empire episode
- Nucky, Jimmy and Eli meet at the hospital
- Episode no.: Season 1 Episode 3
- Directed by: Tim Van Patten
- Written by: Margaret Nagle
- Original air date: October 3, 2010
- Running time: 51 minutes

Guest appearances
- Gretchen Mol as Gillian Darmody; Edoardo Ballerini as Ignacious D'Alessio; Max Casella as Lucien D'Alessio; Peter McRobbie as Supervisor Elliot; Erik Weiner as Agent Sebso; Jordan Gelber as Simon

Episode chronology
← Previous "The Ivory Tower"	Next → "Anastasia"

"Broadway Limited" is the third episode of the first season of the HBO television series Boardwalk Empire, which premiered October 3, 2010. It was written by supervising producer Margaret Nagle and was directed by executive producer Tim Van Patten.

Nucky makes a deal with black gangster Chalky White to handle the repackaging and distribution of bootlegged whiskey. Margaret is given a job at a boutique through Nucky's connections. Van Alden learns that Jimmy was involved in the shooting in the woods.

== Main cast ==
- Steve Buscemi as Enoch "Nucky" Thompson
- Michael Pitt as James "Jimmy" Darmody
- Kelly Macdonald as Margaret Schroeder/Thompson
- Michael Shannon as Nelson Van Alden
- Shea Whigham as Elias "Eli" Thompson
- Aleksa Palladino as Angela Darmody
- Michael Stuhlbarg as Arnold Rothstein
- Vincent Piazza as Charles Luciano
- Paz de la Huerta as Lucy Danziger, Nucky's mistress
- Anthony Laciura as Edward Anselm "Eddie" Kessler, Nucky's assistant and butler.
- Paul Sparks as Mieczyslaw "Mickey Doyle" Kuzik, a bootlegger and former associate of Nucky's.
- Michael K. Williams as Albert "Chalky" White

== Plot ==
After being informed that the robbery survivor has been hospitalized, Nucky orders Eli to kill him before he can be questioned by federal agents. At a livery stable, Nucky finalizes a deal with Chalky to dilute and bottle bootlegged whisky for resale in exchange for 35% of profits. Eli attempts to smother the witness, but is interrupted by Van Alden, who uses a clever ruse to smuggle him out of the hospital. Nucky arranges for Margaret to be hired at a dress shop in Atlantic City's Ritz-Carlton hotel; the Frenchwoman who owns the shop is angered when Nucky makes her fire her experienced assistant. Nucky's mistress, Lucy Danzinger, visits the shop and takes every opportunity to insult Margaret while she assists her in trying on dresses.

Van Alden tries to transport the witness to New York, but is soon forced to get him medical attention. He strongarms a dentist into giving the witness injections of cocaine to keep him alive. The witness reveals Jimmy's involvement in his shooting before dying of complications from torture inflicted on him by Van Alden. Rothstein learns that the witness, a distant family member, has died, and sends Luciano to Atlantic City to find Jimmy and uncover the identity of his accomplice. Elsewhere, Jimmy learns of Angela's friendship with a local photographer and is forced to confront the reality that his decision to fight in the war cost him numerous opportunities to be a good father and provide for his family. Nucky informs Jimmy that with Van Alden on his trail, he can no longer risk his own interests by protecting him. Though Angela protests that he can't leave them again, Jimmy packs his belongings and flees on a train bound for Chicago.

Mickey gets released from jail and meets with his financial backers, the D'Alessio brothers from Philadelphia; displeased with Mickey losing their investment in his liquor business, they demand that he repay their losses or suffer the consequences. Chalky discovers that his driver, a nineteen-year-old boy, has been lynched. Nucky warns Chalky not to spark a race riot by seeking revenge and agrees to increase his take to 50% of profits in return for agreeing to let Eli cover up the killing. Van Alden is ordered to return home by his superiors at the Bureau of Prohibition while they determine whether he has the legal authority to continue his investigation. Nucky silently contemplates whether he might want to start a family.

== First appearances ==
- Leo D'Alessio, The eldest D'Alessio brother, leader of the D'Alessio criminal operation and an acquaintance of Lucky Luciano, Arnold Rothstein and Mickey Doyle.
- Ignacious D'Alessio: Leo's younger brother, a member of the D'Alessio criminal operation and an acquaintance of Arnold Rothstein and Mickey Doyle.
- Pius D'Alessio: The youngest D'Alessio brother, member of the D'Alessio criminal operation and an acquaintance of Mickey Doyle and Arnold Rothstein.
- Edith Mauer: Margaret Schroeder's boorish and hard-headed neighbor.
- Isabelle Jeunet: The owner of the clothing shop La Belle Femme on the Boardwalk who hires Margaret as her assistant.
- Robert Dittrich: A photographer, the co-owner of Dittrich Studios, Mary's husband and an acquaintance of Angela Darmody .
- Mary Dittrich: A photographer, co-owner of Dittrich Studios, Robert's wife and Angela's presumed secret lover.
- Rose Van Alden: Nelson Van Alden's infertile and estranged wife.

== Deaths ==
- Simon: A bootlegger working for Arnold Rothstein who is also his sister-in-law's nephew. He was previously shot and injured by Jimmy Darmody and Al Capone in the Hammonton Hijacking and is now wheeled to and interrogated in a New York hospital by Nelson Van Alden and his partner Agent Sebso with Van Alden accidentally torturing Simon to death whilst interrogating him by poking through his gunshot wounds.
- Kendall: Chalky White's 19-year-old valet who is accidentally hanged to death by the D'Alessio brothers, thinking he was Chalky.

== Reception ==
=== Critical reception ===
Phil Pirrello at IGN gave the episode a positive review with an 8/10 score. He said ""Limited" ends with Nucky forcing Jimmy out of town, and we're left surprised that this turn happens in episode three as opposed to at the end of the season. The first three episodes burn through a lot of story on the Nucky-Jimmy front, but that's okay - sending Jimmy to Chicago to play gangster with Capone is a good thing. It will complicate things for Nucky worse than Rothstein sic-ing Luciano on him. And more Nucky drama is never a bad thing." When talking about Shannon's character Van Alden he said "Shannon's Van Alden is one of the few characters who uses violence as a last resort, as he interrogates the suspect by putting his hand wrist-deep into the man's shotgun wound. As powerful and threatening as men like Nucky are, Van Alden emerges as a truly unique and dangerous threat; a pious federal agent who can use both the Bible and the law to justify his actions. Shannon excels in this scene, and in its follow-up: A quiet dinner at home with the wife that says very little but speaks so much about how complex and unpredictable Van Alden is." Joseph Oliveto at ScreenCrave also gave the episode 8/10 and said "Things are heating up: The previous two episodes of this show featured excellent performances but not much plot development. Luckily, we're picking up the pace now. Characters are facing actual threats, be it from the authorities, or competing criminals. Any good gangster drama needs a constant atmosphere of danger, and now we're getting one."

=== Ratings ===
Ratings for the third episode were mostly stable. Ratings were down 0.1 with adults 18–49 to a 1.4 rating but once again having over 3.4 million viewers in its initial telecast.
