= 58th Primetime Emmy Awards =

2006 American television programming awards

- Promotional poster
- Date: August 27, 2006 (Ceremony); August 19, 2006 (Creative Arts Awards)
- Location: Shrine Auditorium, Los Angeles, California
- Presented by: Academy of Television Arts and Sciences
- Hosted by: Conan O'Brien

Highlights
- Most awards: Major: Elizabeth I (4); All: Elizabeth I (9)
- Most nominations: Mrs. Harris (7)
- Outstanding Comedy Series: The Office
- Outstanding Drama Series: 24
- Outstanding Miniseries: Elizabeth I
- Outstanding Reality-Competition Program: The Amazing Race
- Outstanding Variety, Music or Comedy Series: The Daily Show with Jon Stewart
- Website: http://www.emmys.com/

Television/radio coverage
- Network: NBC
- Produced by: Ken Ehrlich
- Directed by: Louis J. Horvitz

The 58th Primetime Emmy Awards were held on Sunday, August 27, 2006, at the Shrine Auditorium in Los Angeles, California on NBC at 8:00 p.m. ET (00:00 UTC) with Conan O'Brien hosting the show. The ceremony attracted 16.2 million viewers, 2.5 million fewer than the previous year's ceremony, but still the ratings winner for the week. The Discovery Channel received its first major nomination this year. 27 awards were presented.

This awards show was the first in fourteen years to be held in August because of NBC's request; because of NBC Sunday Night Football, the ceremony moved to accommodate NFL Kickoff Weekend.

A new voting system determined nominees in particular categories (mostly lead acting and outstanding series categories) by a "blue ribbon" panel of judges, which resulted in the exclusion of popular shows such as Desperate Housewives and Lost, and actors like James Gandolfini and Edie Falco from The Sopranos and Hugh Laurie from House. Lost's exclusion was mocked during the opening sequence (see below), when O'Brien, accompanied by Hugo "Hurley" Reyes, headed down a hatch to get to the Emmys. O'Brien asked Reyes if he wanted to come; Reyes says coyly, "Well, we weren't exactly invited", to which O'Brien replies "But you won last year!"

For its second season, The Office won Outstanding Comedy Series; this was its only major award. No comedy series won more than two major awards this year. In the drama field, 24 won Outstanding Drama Series for its fifth season, after being nominated and losing the previous four years. It was also the first time the Fox Network won this award. Its three major awards topped all drama series. Its Outstanding Lead Actor, Drama award (for Kiefer Sutherland) was also the first time Fox had won this award.

Ellen Burstyn was nominated for Outstanding Supporting Actress in a Miniseries or Movie for her role in Mrs. Harris, even though she was onscreen for only fourteen seconds, which caused controversy.

The show that received the most major nominations was Mrs. Harris, with seven. The top-nominated show had not received so few nominations since 1970, when Marcus Welby, M.D. received six. However, there were far fewer nominations back then, with most categories having three slots making this ceremony unique.

The pilot episode of My Name Is Earl joined a select group of TV episodes to win for both directing and writing.

== Winners and nominees ==
Winners are listed first and highlighted in bold:

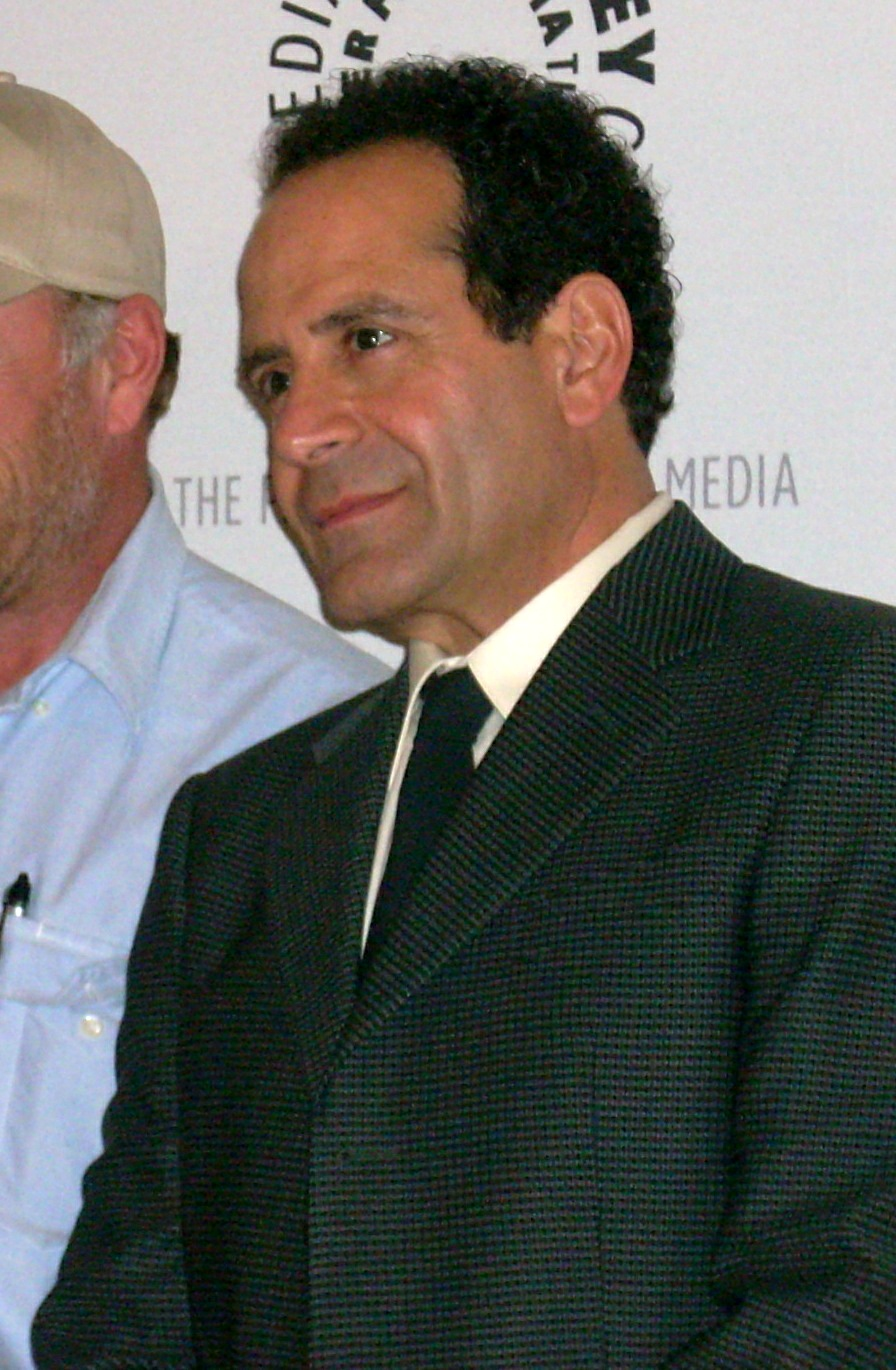
Tony Shalhoub, Outstanding Lead Actor in a Comedy Series winner

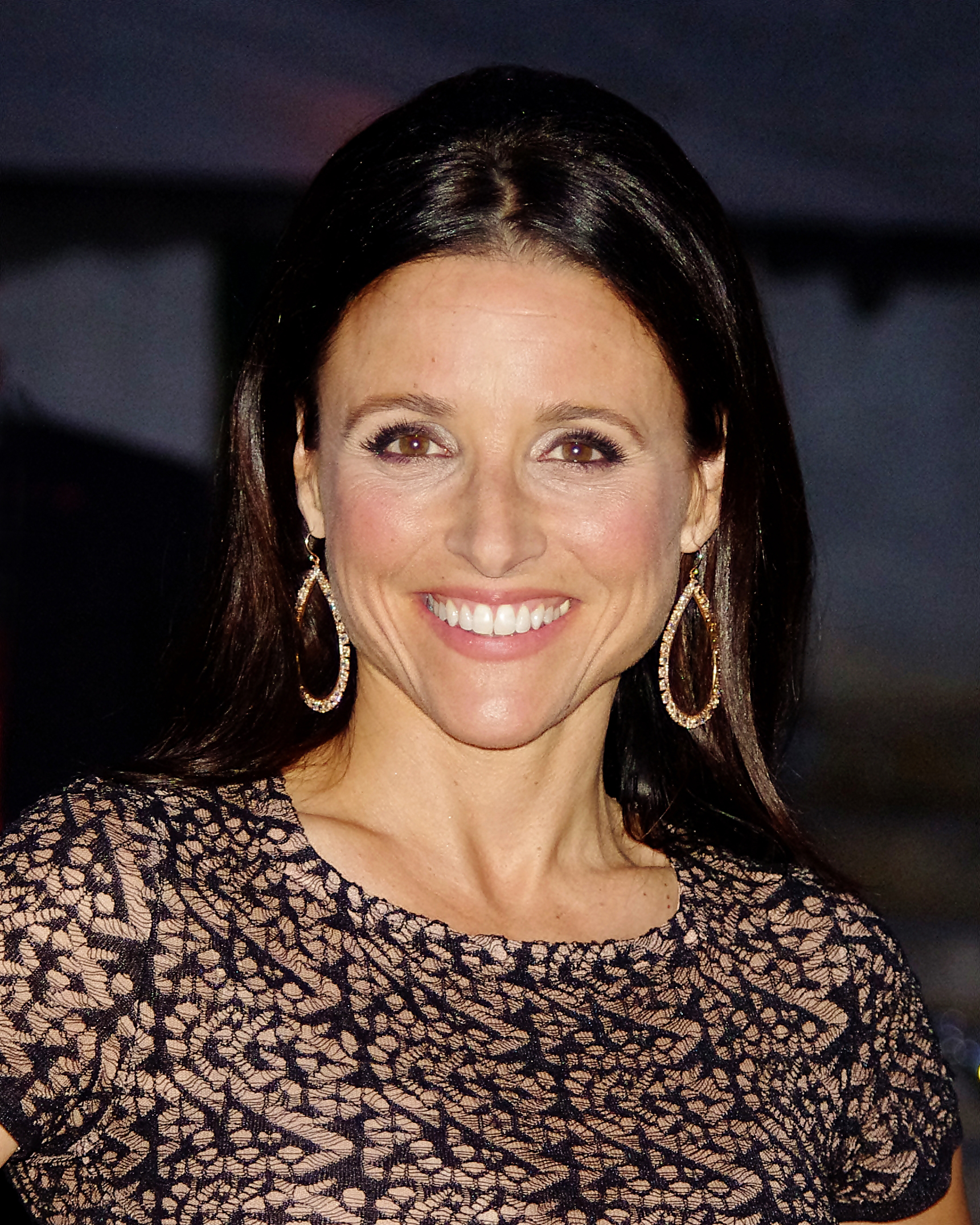
Julia Louis-Dreyfus, Outstanding Lead Actress in a Comedy Series winner

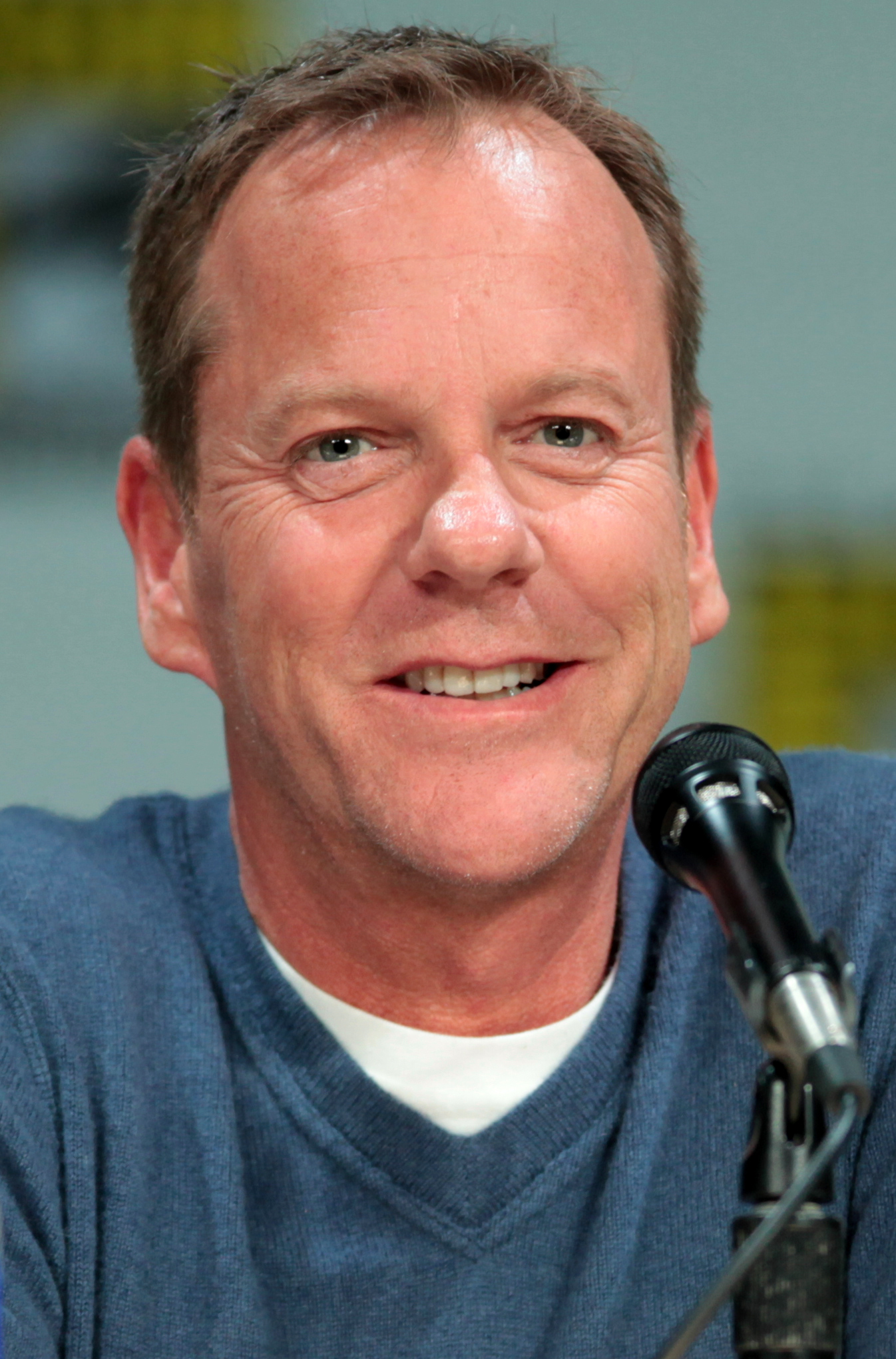
Kiefer Sutherland, Outstanding Lead Actor in a Drama Series winner

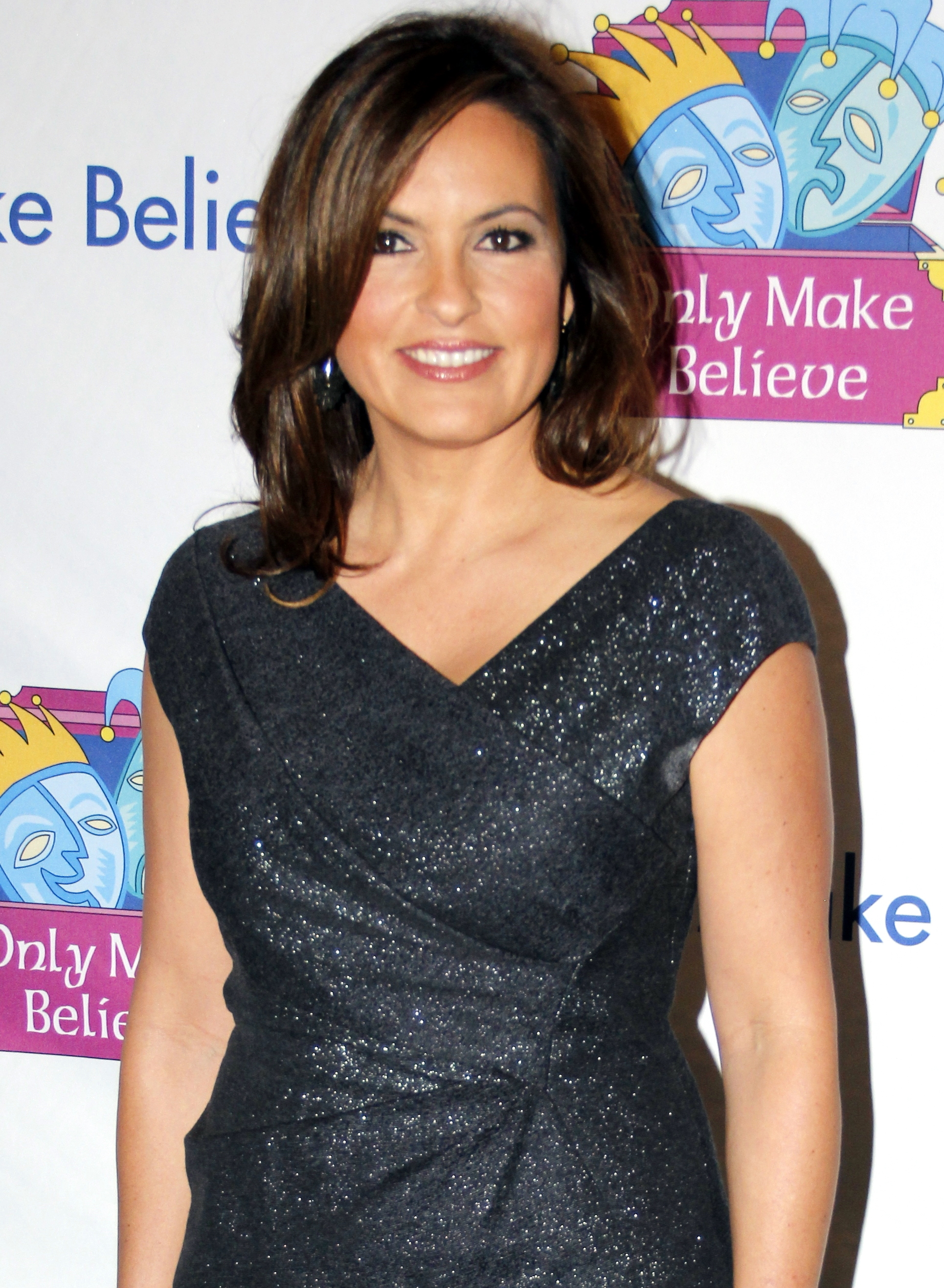
Mariska Hargitay, Outstanding Lead Actress in a Drama Series winner

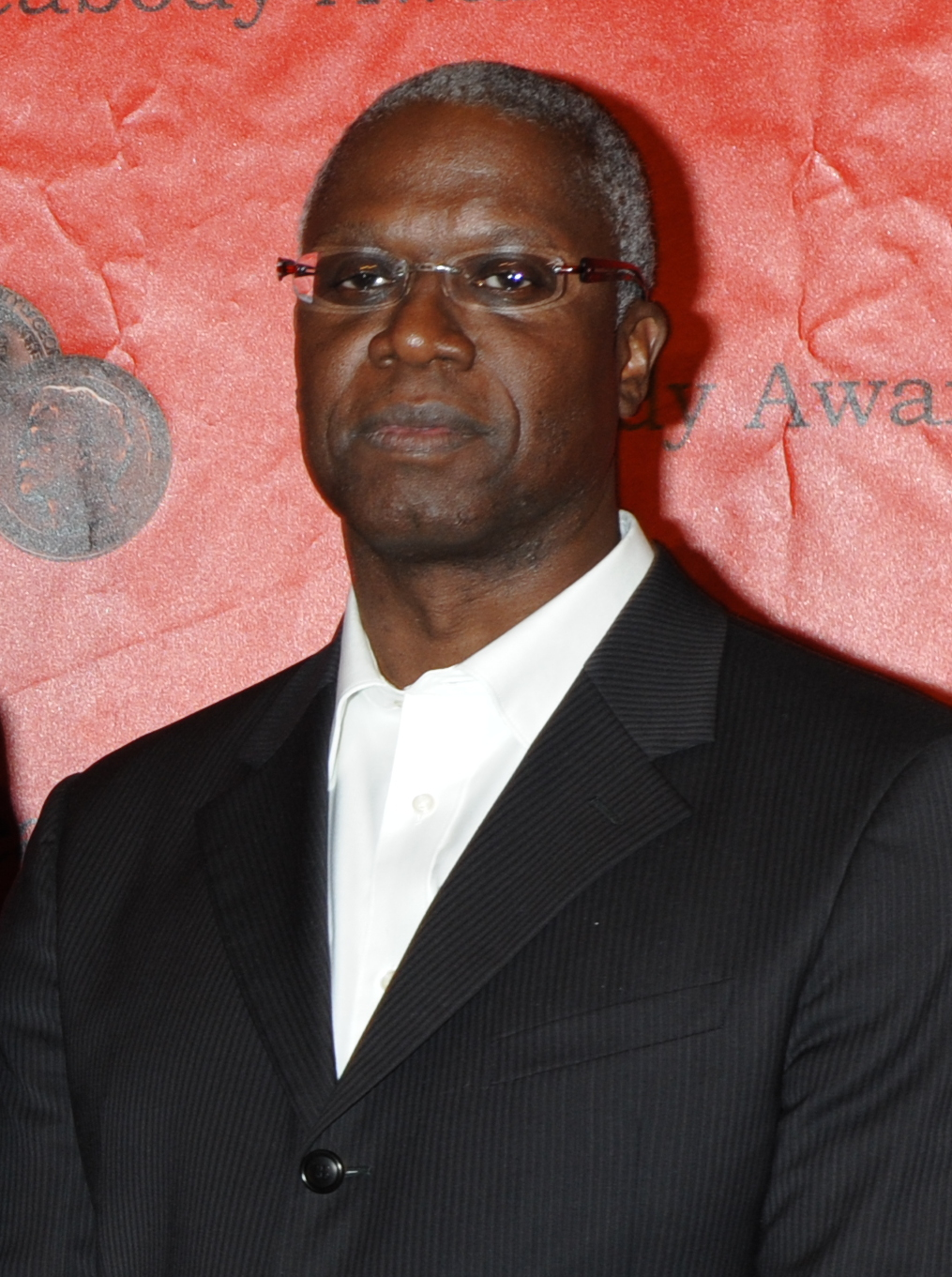
Andre Braugher, Outstanding Lead Actor in a Miniseries or Movie winner

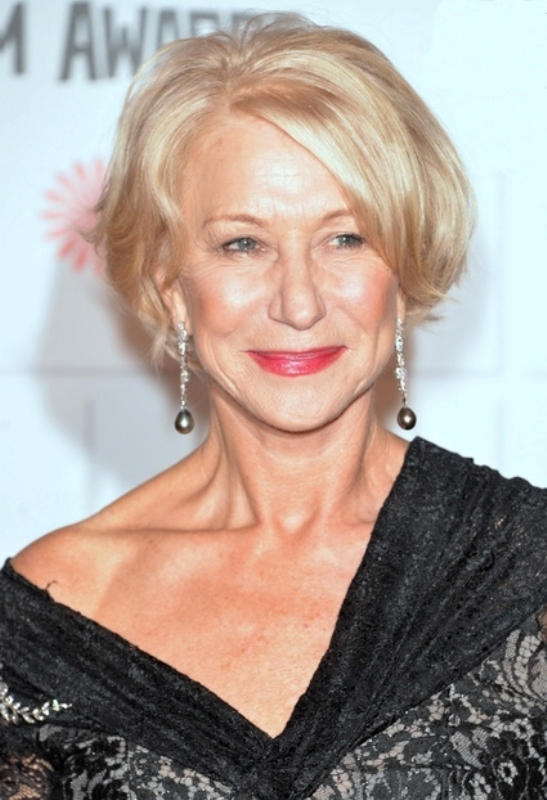
Helen Mirren, Outstanding Lead Actress in a Miniseries or Movie winner

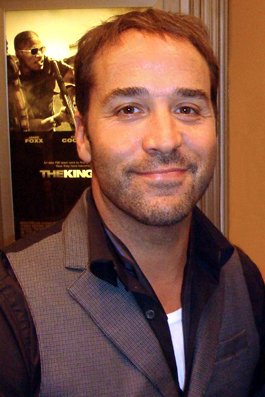
Jeremy Piven, Outstanding Supporting Actor in a Comedy Series winner

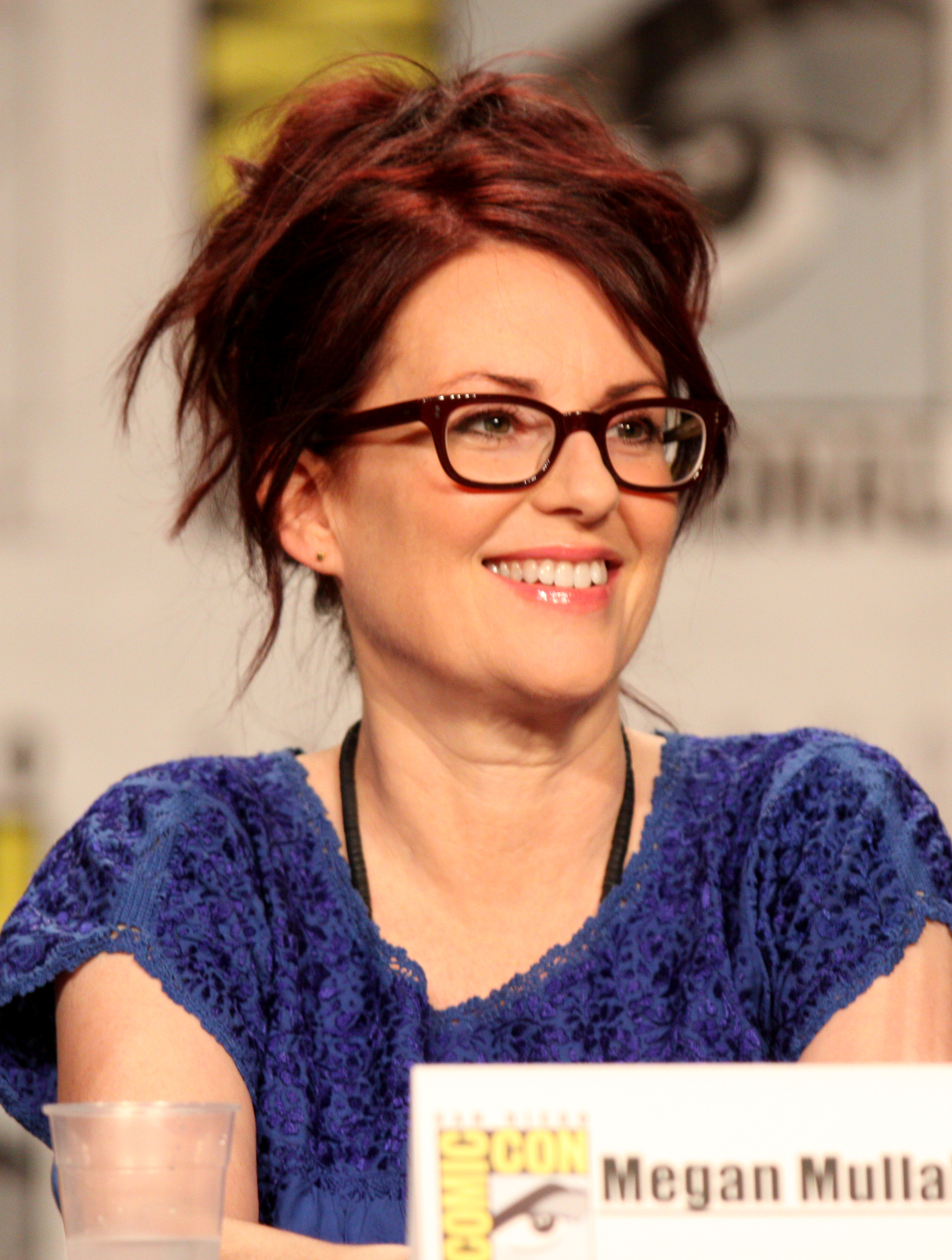
Megan Mullally, Outstanding Supporting Actress in a Comedy Series winner

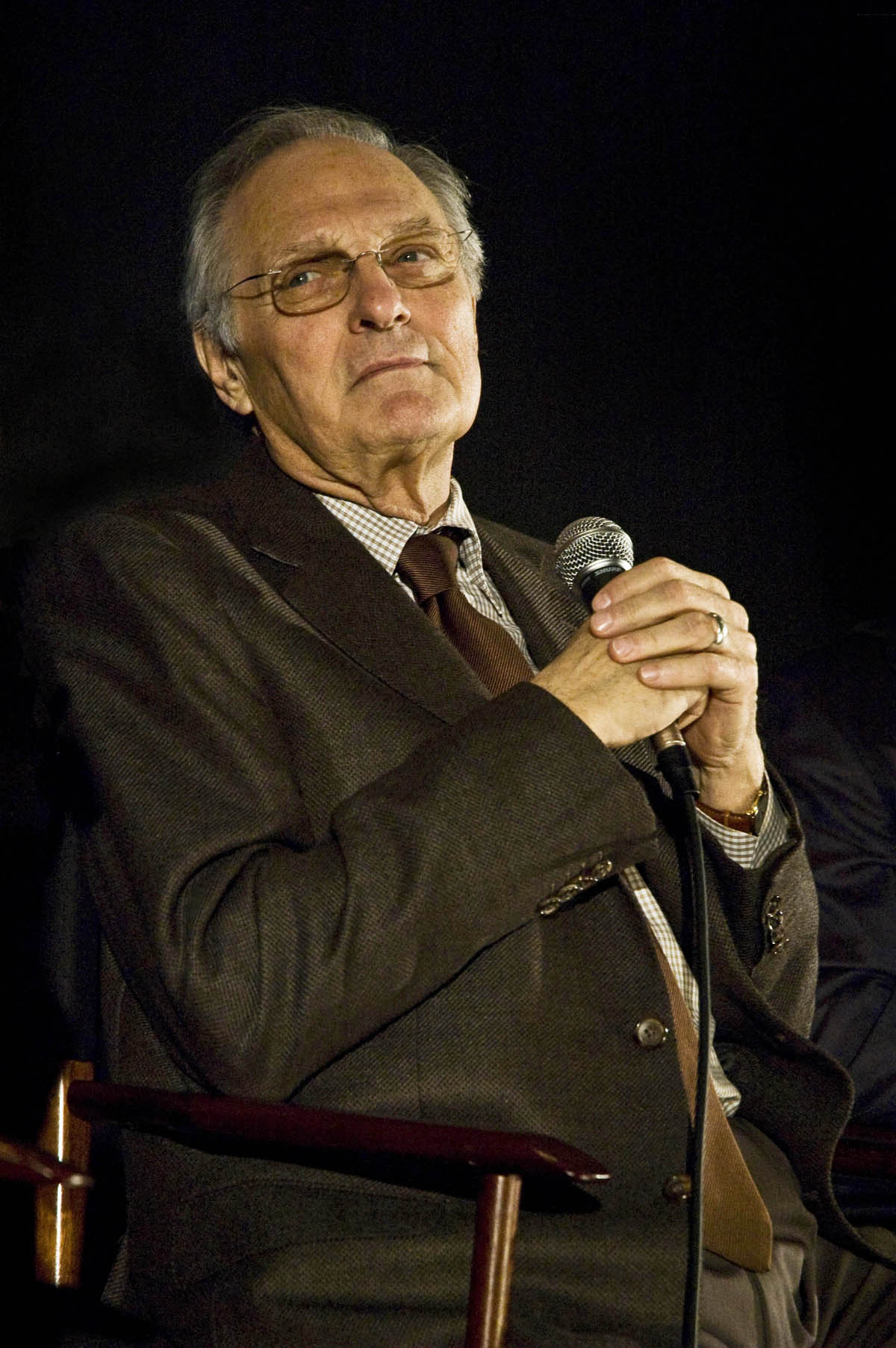
Alan Alda, Outstanding Supporting Actor in a Drama Series winner

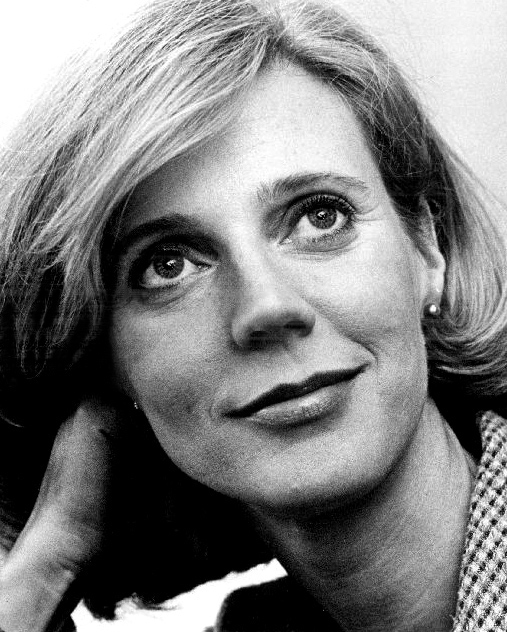
Blythe Danner, Outstanding Supporting Actress in a Drama Series winner

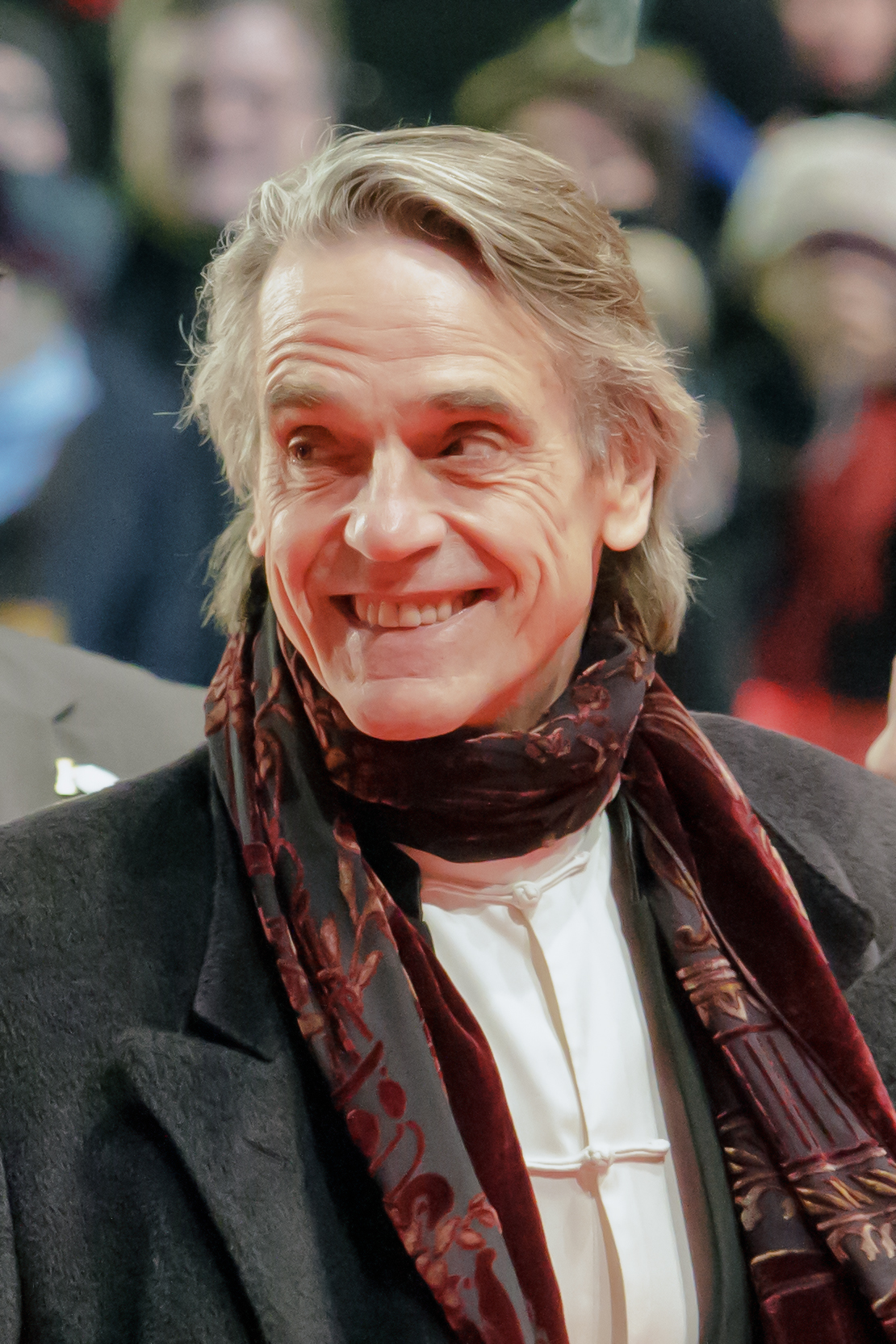
Jeremy Irons, Outstanding Supporting Actor in a Miniseries or Movie winner

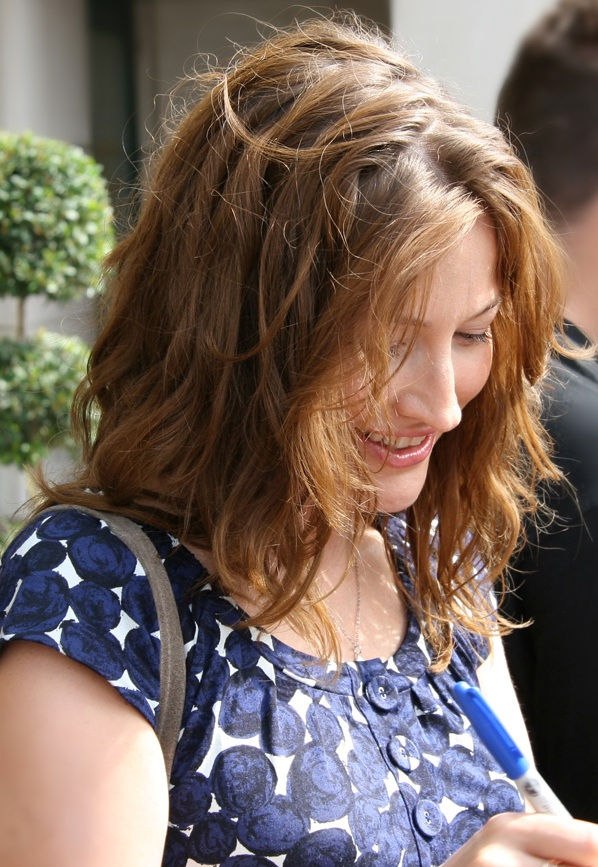
Kelly Macdonald, Outstanding Supporting Actress in a Miniseries or Movie winner

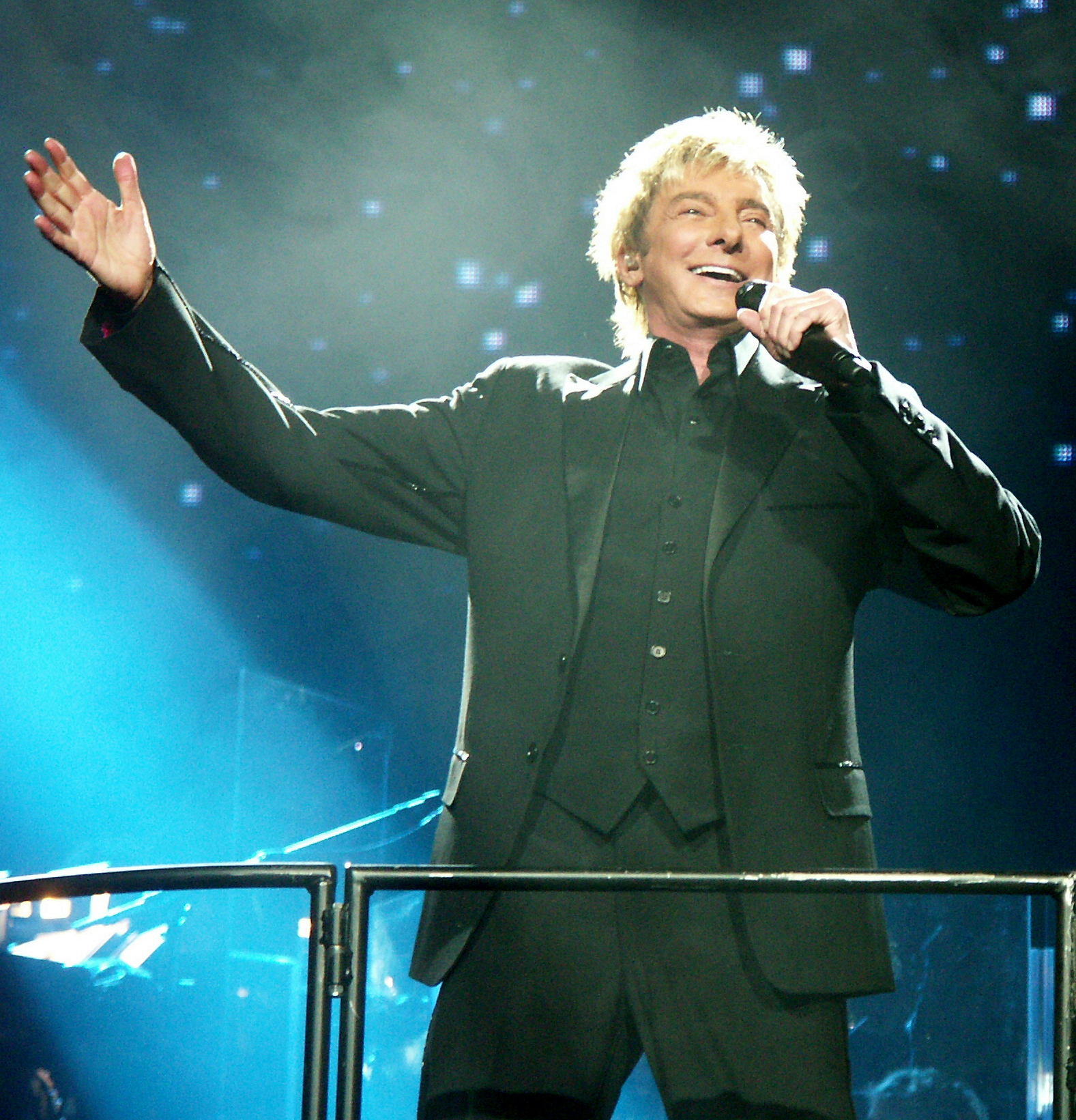
Barry Manilow, Outstanding Individual Performance in a Variety or Music Program winner

=== Programs ===
Programs
**Outstanding Comedy Series**: **The Office (NBC)**; Arrested Development (Fox); Curb Your Enthusiasm (HBO); Scrubs (NBC); Two and a Half Men (CBS)	**Outstanding Drama Series**: **24 (Fox)**; Grey's Anatomy (ABC); House (Fox); The Sopranos (HBO); The West Wing (NBC)
**Outstanding Made for Television Movie**: **The Girl in the Café (HBO)**; Flight 93 (A&E); The Flight That Fought Back (Discovery Channel); Mrs. Harris (HBO); Yesterday (HBO)	**Outstanding Miniseries**: **Elizabeth I (HBO)**; Bleak House (PBS); Into the West (TNT); Sleeper Cell (Showtime)
**Outstanding Variety, Music or Comedy Series**: **The Daily Show with Jon Stewart (Comedy Central)**; The Colbert Report (Comedy Central); Late Night with Conan O'Brien (NBC); Late Show with David Letterman (CBS); Real Time with Bill Maher (HBO)	**Outstanding Reality-Competition Program**: **The Amazing Race (CBS)**; American Idol (Fox); Dancing with the Stars (ABC); Project Runway (Bravo); Survivor (CBS)

=== Acting ===
==== Lead performances ====
Lead performances
**Outstanding Lead Actor in a Comedy Series**: **Tony Shalhoub – Monk as Adrian Monk (USA)**; Steve Carell – The Office as Michael Scott (NBC); Larry David – Curb Your Enthusiasm as himself (HBO); Kevin James – The King of Queens as Doug Heffernan (CBS); Charlie Sheen – Two and a Half Men as Charlie Harper (CBS)	**Outstanding Lead Actress in a Comedy Series**: **Julia Louis-Dreyfus – The New Adventures of Old Christine as Christine Campbell (CBS)**; Stockard Channing – Out of Practice as Lydia Barnes (CBS); Jane Kaczmarek – Malcolm in the Middle as Lois (Fox) (Episode: “Lois Strikes Back”); Lisa Kudrow – The Comeback as Valerie Cherish (HBO); Debra Messing – Will & Grace as Grace Adler (NBC)
**Outstanding Lead Actor in a Drama Series**: **Kiefer Sutherland – 24 as Jack Bauer (Fox)**; Peter Krause – Six Feet Under as Nate Fisher (HBO); Denis Leary – Rescue Me as Tommy Gavin (FX); Christopher Meloni – Law & Order: Special Victims Unit as Elliot Stabler (NBC); Martin Sheen – The West Wing as President Jed Bartlet (NBC)	**Outstanding Lead Actress in a Drama Series**: **Mariska Hargitay – Law & Order: Special Victims Unit as Olivia Benson (NBC)**; Frances Conroy – Six Feet Under as Ruth Fisher (HBO); Geena Davis – Commander in Chief as President Mackenzie Allen (ABC); Allison Janney – The West Wing as C. J. Cregg (NBC); Kyra Sedgwick – The Closer as Brenda Leigh Johnson (TNT)
**Outstanding Lead Actor in a Miniseries or Movie**: **Andre Braugher – Thief as Nick Atwater (FX)**; Charles Dance – Bleak House as Mr. Tulkinghorn (PBS); Ben Kingsley – Mrs. Harris as Dr. Herman Tarnower (HBO); Donald Sutherland – Human Trafficking as Bill Meehan (Lifetime); Jon Voight – Pope John Paul II as Pope John Paul II (CBS)	**Outstanding Lead Actress in a Miniseries or Movie**: **Helen Mirren – Elizabeth I as Elizabeth I (HBO)**; Gillian Anderson – Bleak House as Lady Dedlock (PBS); Kathy Bates – Ambulance Girl as Jane Stern (Lifetime); Annette Bening – Mrs. Harris as Jean Harris (HBO); Judy Davis – A Little Thing Called Murder as Sante Kimes (Lifetime)
**Outstanding Individual Performance in a Variety or Music Program**: **Barry Manilow – Barry Manilow: Music and Passion (PBS)**; Stephen Colbert – The Colbert Report (Comedy Central); Craig Ferguson – The Late Late Show with Craig Ferguson (CBS); Hugh Jackman – The 59th Annual Tony Awards (CBS); David Letterman – Late Show with David Letterman (CBS)

==== Supporting performances ====
Supporting performances
**Outstanding Supporting Actor in a Comedy Series**: **Jeremy Piven – Entourage as Ari Gold (HBO)**; Will Arnett – Arrested Development as George "G.O.B." Bluth Jr. (Fox); Bryan Cranston – Malcolm in the Middle as Hal (Fox) (Episodes: “Colleges Recruiters” and “Hal Grieves”); Jon Cryer – Two and a Half Men as Dr. Alan Harper (CBS) (Episodes: "Ergo, the Booty Call", "Weekend in Bangkok"); Sean Hayes – Will & Grace as Jack McFarland (NBC)	**Outstanding Supporting Actress in a Comedy Series**: **Megan Mullally – Will & Grace as Karen Walker (NBC)**; Cheryl Hines – Curb Your Enthusiasm as Cheryl David (HBO); Elizabeth Perkins – Weeds as Celia Hodes (Showtime); Jaime Pressly – My Name Is Earl as Joy Turner (NBC) (Episodes: “Joy’s Wedding” and “The Bounty Hunter”; Alfre Woodard – Desperate Housewives as Betty Applewhite (ABC) (Episodes: "You'll Never Get Away From Me", "I Know Things Now")
**Outstanding Supporting Actor in a Drama Series**: **Alan Alda – The West Wing as Arnold Vinick (NBC)**; Michael Imperioli – The Sopranos as Christopher Moltisanti (HBO); Gregory Itzin – 24 as Charles Logan (Fox); Oliver Platt – Huff as Russell Tupper (Showtime); William Shatner – Boston Legal as Denny Crane (ABC)	**Outstanding Supporting Actress in a Drama Series**: **Blythe Danner – Huff as Isabelle "Izzy" Huffstodt (Showtime)**; Candice Bergen – Boston Legal as Shirley Schmidt (ABC); Sandra Oh – Grey's Anatomy as Dr. Cristina Yang (ABC); Jean Smart – 24 as Martha Logan (Fox); Chandra Wilson – Grey's Anatomy as Dr. Miranda Bailey (ABC)
**Outstanding Supporting Actor in a Miniseries or Movie**: **Jeremy Irons – Elizabeth I as Robert Dudley, Earl of Leicester (HBO)**; Robert Carlyle – Human Trafficking as Sergei Karpovich (Lifetime); Clifton Collins Jr. – Thief as Jack Hill (FX); Hugh Dancy – Elizabeth I as Robert Devereux, Earl of Essex (HBO); Denis Lawson – Bleak House as John Jarndyce (PBS)	**Outstanding Supporting Actress in a Miniseries or Movie**: **Kelly Macdonald – The Girl in the Café as Gina (HBO)**; Ellen Burstyn – Mrs. Harris as Former Tarnower Steady (HBO); Shirley Jones – Hidden Places as Aunt Batty (Hallmark); Cloris Leachman – Mrs. Harris as Pearl Schwartz (HBO); Alfre Woodard – The Water Is Wide as Mrs. Brown (CBS)

=== Directing ===
Directing
**Outstanding Directing for a Comedy Series**: **My Name Is Earl: "Pilot" – Marc Buckland (NBC)**; The Comeback: "Valerie Does Another Classic Leno" – Michael Patrick King (HBO); Curb Your Enthusiasm: "The Christ Nail" – Robert B. Weide (HBO); Entourage: "Oh, Mandy" – Dan Attias (HBO); Entourage: "The Sundance Kids" – Julian Farino (HBO); Weeds: "Good Shit Lollipop" – Craig Zisk (Showtime)	**Outstanding Directing for a Drama Series**: **24: "Day 5: 7:00 a.m. – 8:00 a.m." – Jon Cassar (Fox)**; Big Love: "Pilot" – Rodrigo García (HBO); Lost: "Live Together, Die Alone" – Jack Bender (ABC); Six Feet Under: "Everyone's Waiting" – Alan Ball (HBO); The Sopranos: "Join the Club" – David Nutter (HBO); The Sopranos: "Members Only" – Tim Van Patten (HBO); The West Wing: "Election Day: Part I" – Mimi Leder (NBC)
**Outstanding Directing for a Variety, Music or Comedy Program**: **The 78th Annual Academy Awards – Louis J. Horvitz (ABC)**; American Idol: "Finale" – Bruce Gowers (Fox); The Colbert Report – Jim Hoskinson (Comedy Central); The Daily Show with Jon Stewart – Chuck O'Neill (Comedy Central); Saturday Night Live: "Host: Steve Martin" – Beth McCarthy-Miller (NBC)	**Outstanding Directing for a Miniseries, Movie or Dramatic Special**: **Elizabeth I – Tom Hooper (HBO)**; Bleak House – Justin Chadwick (PBS); Flight 93 – Peter Markle (A&E); The Girl in the Café – David Yates (HBO); High School Musical – Kenny Ortega (Disney); Mrs. Harris – Phyllis Nagy (HBO)

=== Writing ===
Writing
**Outstanding Writing for a Comedy Series**: **My Name Is Earl: "Pilot" – Greg Garcia (NBC)**; Arrested Development: "Development Arrested" – Chuck Tatham, Jim Vallely, Richard Day, and Mitchell Hurwitz (Fox); Entourage: "Exodus" – Doug Ellin (HBO); Extras: "Kate Winslet" – Ricky Gervais and Stephen Merchant (HBO); The Office: "Christmas Party" – Michael Schur (NBC)	**Outstanding Writing for a Drama Series**: **The Sopranos: "Members Only" – Terence Winter (HBO)**; Grey's Anatomy: "Into You Like a Train" – Krista Vernoff (ABC); Grey's Anatomy: "It's the End of the World" / "As We Know It" – Shonda Rhimes (ABC); Lost: "The 23rd Psalm" – Carlton Cuse and Damon Lindelof (ABC); Six Feet Under: "Everyone's Waiting" – Alan Ball (HBO)
**Outstanding Writing for a Variety, Music or Comedy Program**: **The Daily Show with Jon Stewart (Comedy Central)**; The Colbert Report (Comedy Central); Late Night with Conan O'Brien (NBC); Late Show with David Letterman (CBS); Real Time with Bill Maher (HBO)	**Outstanding Writing for a Miniseries, Movie or Dramatic Special**: **The Girl in the Café – Richard Curtis (HBO)**; Bleak House – Andrew Davies (PBS); Elizabeth I – Nigel Williams (HBO); Flight 93 – Nevin Schreiner (A&E); Mrs. Harris – Phyllis Nagy (HBO)

== Most major nominations ==
Networks with multiple major nominations (Note: "Major" constitutes the categories listed above: Program, Acting, Directing, and Writing. Does not include the technical categories.)
Network	No. of Nominations
HBO	48
NBC	27
CBS	22
ABC	15
Fox	10

Programs with multiple major nominations
Program	Category	Network	No. of Nominations
Mrs. Harris	Movie	HBO	7
Bleak House	Miniseries	PBS	6
Elizabeth I	Miniseries	HBO	6
24	Drama	Fox	5
Grey's Anatomy	Drama	ABC	5
The Sopranos	Drama	HBO	5
The West Wing	Drama	NBC	5
The Colbert Report	Variety	Comedy Central	4
Curb Your Enthusiasm	Comedy	HBO	4
Entourage	Comedy	HBO	4
The Girl in the Café	Movie	HBO	4
Six Feet Under	Drama	HBO	4
Arrested Development	Comedy	Fox	3
The Daily Show with Jon Stewart	Variety	Comedy Central	3
Flight 93	Movie	A&E	3
Late Show with David Letterman	Variety	CBS	3
My Name Is Earl	Comedy	NBC	3
The Office	Comedy	NBC	3
Two and a Half Men	Comedy	CBS	3
Will & Grace	Comedy	NBC	3
American Idol	Competition	Fox	2
Boston Legal	Drama	ABC	2
The Comeback	Comedy	HBO	2
Huff	Drama	Showtime	2
Human Trafficking	Miniseries	Lifetime	2
Late Night with Conan O'Brien	Variety	NBC	2
Law & Order: Special Victims Unit	Drama	NBC	2
Lost	Drama	ABC	2
Malcolm in the Middle	Comedy	Fox	2
Real Time with Bill Maher	Variety	HBO	2
Thief	Miniseries	FX	2
Weeds	Comedy	Showtime	2

== Most major awards ==
Networks with multiple major awards
Network	No. of Awards
HBO	9
NBC	6
Fox	3
CBS	2
Comedy Central	2

Programs with multiple major awards
Program	Category	Network	No. of Awards
Elizabeth I	Miniseries	HBO	4
24	Drama	Fox	3
The Girl in the Café	Movie	HBO	3
The Daily Show with Jon Stewart	Variety	Comedy Central	2
My Name Is Earl	Comedy	NBC	2

== Presenters and performers ==
=== Presenters ===
The awards were presented by the following people:

Presenters at the ceremony
Name(s)	Role
Patrick Dempsey; Ellen Pompeo	Presented the award for Outstanding Supporting Actress in a Comedy Series
Sean Hayes; Julia Louis-Dreyfus	Presented the award for Outstanding Supporting Actor in a Drama Series
Charlie Sheen; Martin Sheen	Presented the award for Outstanding Supporting Actress in a Drama Series
Jason Lee; Jaime Pressly	Presented the award for Outstanding Supporting Actor in a Comedy Series
Dennis Haysbert; William Petersen	Presented the award for Outstanding Supporting Actress in a Miniseries or a Movie
Heidi Klum; John Lithgow; Jeffrey Tambor	Presented the award for Outstanding Variety, Music or Comedy Series
Ron Livingston; Jennifer Love Hewitt	Introduced Outstanding Guest Actor in a Comedy Series winner Leslie Jordan and Outstanding Guest Actress in a Comedy Series winner Cloris Leachman
Leslie Jordan; Cloris Leachman	Presented the awards for Outstanding Directing for a Comedy Series and Outstanding Writing for a Comedy Series
Simon Cowell	Presented of a special presentation paying tribute to Dick Clark
Tina Fey; Tracy Morgan	Presented the award for Outstanding Individual Performance in a Variety or Music Program
Evangeline Lilly; Wentworth Miller	Introduced Outstanding Guest Actor in a Drama Series winner Christian Clemenson and Outstanding Guest Actress in a Drama Series winner Patricia Clarkson; Presented the award for Outstanding Writing for a Drama Series
Christian Clemenson	Presented the award for Outstanding Directing for a Drama Series
Mariska Hargitay; Tom Selleck	Presented the award for Outstanding Supporting Actor in a Miniseries or a Movie
Howie Mandel; Megan Mullally	Presented the awards for Outstanding Directing for a Variety, Music or Comedy Program and Outstanding Writing for a Variety, Music or Comedy Program
Hugh Laurie; Helen Mirren	Presented the award for Outstanding Lead Actor in a Miniseries or a Movie
Matthew Perry; Bradley Whitford	Presented the award for Outstanding Lead Actor in a Comedy Series
Candice Bergen	Introduced the chairman of Academy of Television Arts & Sciences, Dick Askin
Joan Collins; Stephen Collins; Farrah Fawcett; Kate Jackson; Heather Locklear; Jaclyn Smith	Presented of a special presentation paying tribute to Aaron Spelling
Eva Longoria; James Woods	Presented the award for Outstanding Made for Television Movie
Stephen Colbert; Jon Stewart	Presented the award for Outstanding Reality-Competition Program
Omar Epps; Katherine Heigl	Presented the awards for Outstanding Directing for a Miniseries, Movie or Dramatic Special and Outstanding Writing for a Miniseries, Movie or Dramatic Special
Edie Falco; James Gandolfini	Presented the award for Outstanding Miniseries
Felicity Huffman; Kiefer Sutherland	Presented the award for Outstanding Lead Actress in a Miniseries or Movie
Craig Ferguson; Calista Flockhart	Presented the award for Outstanding Lead Actress in a Drama Series
Tyra Banks; Victor Garber	Presented the award for Outstanding Lead Actress in a Comedy Series
Ray Liotta; Virginia Madsen	Presented the award for Outstanding Lead Actor in a Drama Series
Bob Newhart	Presented the award for Outstanding Comedy Series
Annette Bening	Presented the award for Outstanding Drama Series

=== Performers ===
Name(s)	Performed
Conan O'Brien	"Ya Got Trouble"
Barry Manilow	"Bandstand Boogie"

== Opening sequence and subsequent controversy ==
=== The plane crash Lost parody ===
The opening sequence of the 58th Primetime Emmy Awards show depicted host Conan O'Brien wearing a tuxedo, sitting in luxury on a plane, sipping champagne and mentioning to the flight attendant that this would be the second Emmy's ceremony that he would be hosting. O'Brien then rhetorically asked the flight attendant, "What could possibly go wrong?" Immediately after that, the plane began to experience turbulence and then was portrayed as having crashed on (or near) an island. O'Brien is then seen walking ashore on the beach and onto the island still wearing his (now drenched) tuxedo. Hurley appears and then follows O'Brien to a hatch. When O'Brien asks if he wants to come along, Hurley says that they "weren't exactly invited". O'Brien enters the hatch and arrives on the set of The Office.

The intention of this opening sequence was to parody the premise of the ABC series Lost. However, the sequence reportedly disturbed some viewers because of the Comair Flight 5191 disaster that had occurred earlier in the day. Cincinnati NBC affiliate WLWT-TV had the unfortunate coincidence of running a "Breaking News" scroll about the crash at the same time as the scene was airing.

Entertainment industry critics, such as LA Weekly columnist Nikki Finke, lambasted NBC's decision to not pull the plane crash portion of the opening sequence, in light of the aforementioned crash earlier that day. Finke stated that she believed NBC could have—with relative ease—instructed their writers to come up with a different sketch at the last minute, which could have been used as a substitute.

=== Other parodies ===
The skit also parodied shows such as The Office, 24, House, South Park, and Dateline NBC (specifically, the "To Catch a Predator" segments). An animated Tom Cruise from the South Park episode "Trapped in the Closet" appears in a skit where an animated O'Brien hides in Stan Marsh's closet, only to run away when he discovers Cruise has already occupied the closet.

== Tributes ==
The show featured tributes to two TV legends: Dick Clark ("America's Oldest Teenager"), and Aaron Spelling, producer of such classic TV shows as Dynasty and Beverly Hills, 90210. The former tribute was presented by Simon Cowell, American Idol judge, with a performance by Barry Manilow, who won a Primetime Emmy Award later that evening. Joan Collins, Heather Locklear, and Stephen Collins, along with the original three Charlie's Angels, gave the tribute for Spelling.

== In Memoriam ==
Joan Collins, Heather Locklear, Stephen Collins, Farrah Fawcett, Kate Jackson and Jaclyn Smith Pays Tribute To Aaron Spelling

- Dennis Weaver
- Barnard Hughes
- Mrs. Philo T. Farnsworth
- Don Adams
- Dan Curtis
- Lew Anderson
- Ralph Edwards
- Curt Gowdy
- Robert Sterling
- Michael Piller
- Red Buttons
- Mike Douglas
- Scott Brazil
- Anthony Franciosa
- Phyllis Huffman
- Darren McGavin
- Gloria Monty
- Jan Murray
- Pat Morita
- Al Lewis
- Maureen Stapleton
- Buck Owens
- Jack Warden
- Don Knotts
- Robert Wise
- John Spencer
- Louis Nye
- Shelley Winters
- Richard Pryor
