= Bohack =

Defunct New York City grocery chain

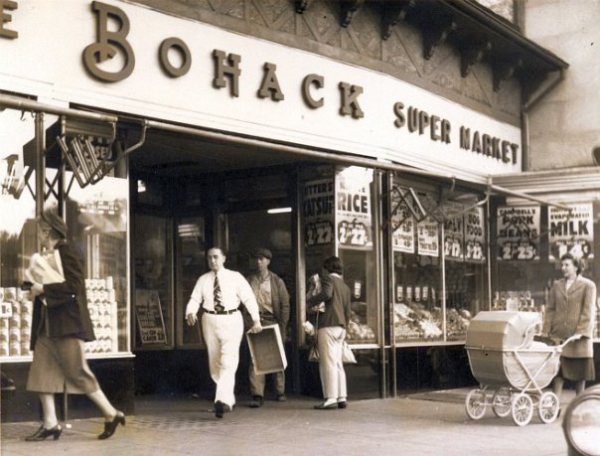
Bohack supermarket in Kew Gardens, Queens.

Bohack (full company name "H.C. Bohack", sometimes informally referred to as "Bohack's") was a chain of grocery stores located in the New York City area that opened in 1887 and closed in 1977. They were headquartered in Maspeth, Queens. The founder, Henry C. Bohack, opened the first store on Fulton Street in Brooklyn. Throughout the 1960s, Bohack purchased Daitch Shopwell, Packers, and several other supermarket businesses. Stores throughout the company's existence were located in New York City, on Long Island, in Westchester County, New York, and Fairfield County, Connecticut. Bohack also owned and incorporated gas stations in the 1920s and 30s.

In 1977 Ar-Bee Food Equipment of LIC, NY Purchased all of Bohack's Food Equipment during the warehouse auction/liquidation on Metropolitan Avenue. Most of the equipment was re-sold by Ar-Bee to other supermarket owners before it left the dock. Ar-Bee removed the rest and stored it in their LIC, NY warehouse. Ar-bee rebuilt and sold equipment to Supermarkets in Metro-NYC and LI, Remaining items were stripped and used for service/repair by Ar-Bee's service department. ASI Food Equipment Repairs.

== Use in media ==
The Bohack location at 87th St and 2nd Ave was featured in The Odd Couple when Felix went in and did shopping for his and Oscar's date night with the “Coo-coo” Pigeon sisters.

In the episode "Members Only" of The Sopranos, mobster Corrado "Junior" Soprano was involved in the bust-out of a Bohack store in the 1970s. His nephew Tony attempts to dig up Junior's share of the money from his backyard but is frustrated by his uncle's inability to remember where the money is and his mistaken belief that "Pussy" Malanga, the deceased criminal who orchestrated the theft, is planning to steal it back.
