= Eldorado (Boardwalk Empire) =

- Boardwalk Empire episode
- Episode no.: Season 5 Episode 8
- Directed by: Tim Van Patten
- Written by: Terence Winter; Howard Korder
- Original air date: October 26, 2014
- Running time: 57 minutes

Guest appearances
- Ian Hart as Ethan Thompson 1897; Domenick Lombardozzi as Ralph Capone; Anatol Yusef as Meyer Lansky; Marc Pickering as Nucky Thompson 1897; Matt Letscher as Joseph P. Kennedy; Maya Kazan as Mabel Thompson; Michael Zegen as Benjamin "Bugsy" Siegel; John Ellison Conlee as Commodore Louis Kaestner 1897; Travis Tope as "Joe Harper"/Tommy Darmody; Louis Cancelmi as Mike D'Angelo; Erin Dilly as Elenore Thompson; Nolan Lyons as Nucky Thompson 1884; Michael Countryman as Frank Wilson; Paul Fitzgerald as Charles Gabler; Richard Bekins as Theodore Rollins; John C. Vennema as Lawrence Conors

Episode chronology
← Previous "Friendless Child"	Next → —

"Eldorado" is the series finale of the HBO series Boardwalk Empire. It is the eighth episode of the fifth season, and the 56th episode of the series overall. The episode was written by series creator Terence Winter and executive producer Howard Korder, and was directed by executive producer Tim Van Patten. It aired on October 26, 2014. It portrays protagonist Nucky Thompson trying to tie up loose ends before retiring from the bootlegging business, as his past comes back to haunt him.

== Plot ==
1897

Nucky, now Deputy Sheriff of Atlantic City, finds out Mabel has miscarried their child. Later that day, Eli calls him to stop their father from beating their mother. Nucky gets into a fight with his father and warns him that there will be consequences if he lays hands on her again. His father replies that Nucky will never be able to escape where he came from. At a town parade, the Commodore tells Nucky to turn in his badge, but offers to promote him to sheriff if he brings Gillian to him; it is implied that the Commodore intends to rape her. After a moment's hesitation, Nucky approaches Gillian, telling her that the Commodore wants to help her. He then promises that he will always look after her.

1931

With his holdings in Atlantic City lost, Nucky decides to go for a swim in the ocean. Meanwhile, in New York, due to Nucky's manipulation of Mayflower Grain stock, Kennedy's business associates begin unloading their shares. Kennedy suspects Nucky's involvement and confronts Margaret, who convinces him to short sell his own shares. Margaret helps Kennedy and Nucky make a huge profit from the sale. Impressed, Kennedy offers to make Margaret his business partner. She meets Nucky at an apartment he is looking to purchase with his new fortune, to inform him of her success, and they share a slow dance in quiet. Nucky later returns to Atlantic City, intending to leave forever. He says goodbye to Eli, gives him some money and encourages him to return to his family. He then meets Gillian in the sanatorium, telling her the most he can do is set up a trust fund for her when she is released. Gillian says nothing through the conversation, seemingly ignoring Nucky. When he prompts her to answer, she replies with an unrelated question about ladybugs. When they depart, she attempts to get up and winces in pain, feeling her abdomen. It is implied she underwent the same procedure that left another woman catatonic.

Back in New York, Luciano and Lansky gather the country's most powerful crime bosses and form The Commission, a singular body that mediates relations between all crime organizations in the country. On orders from Luciano, Siegel kills Narcisse in front of his church in Harlem. In Chicago, Capone is served a court summons when the authorities manage to obtain his ledgers. While he publicly boasts that the charges of tax evasion won't stick, Capone says goodbye to his son before heading to court, where D'Angelo is waiting for him.

On his last night in Atlantic City, Nucky receives a call from the police, who have arrested Joe. Nucky bails Joe out of jail and gives him some money, but Joe angrily refuses Nucky's help. Nucky runs into Joe again hours later, and Joe reveals that he is in fact Tommy Darmody – Jimmy Darmody's son and Gillian's grandson. Tommy shoots Nucky three times (once in the cheek, similar to how Nucky shot Jimmy) before being restrained by the police. At the same time, IRS agents, who had followed Nucky the entire evening, identify themselves and arrest Tommy. As Nucky dies, he sees a vision of himself as a young boy, swimming in the ocean and catching a coin.

== Reception ==
Upon airing in the United States on October 26, 2014, on HBO, the episode was watched by 2.33 million viewers.

Rotten Tomatoes gave the final episode a 92% rating based on 12 critic reviews, with the critical consensus "Despite the limitations of its shortened final season, Boardwalk Empire wraps up the saga of Nucky Thompson in an effective series finale that both offers closure and leaves a few things to ponder." Genevieve Valentine of The A.V. Club gave "Eldorado" an A−, calling it a fitting end to the series: "In its characterization and dialogue, in its shots of the lonely shore or a smoky nightclub, in the moments of dry humor or unexpected tenderness, Boardwalk Empire was an often-fascinating portrait of an age. It came and went quietly (ad campaign to the contrary), but at its best, it told one hell of a story." Martin Chilton of The Daily Telegraph gave the finale five out of five stars and wrote that, "Steve Buscemi and Stephen Graham were brilliant in 'Eldorado', the finale of the superb HBO crime drama Boardwalk Empire."

== Accolades ==
Ceremony	Category	Recipient(s)	Result
67th Primetime Emmy Awards	Outstanding Directing for a Drama Series	Tim Van Patten	Nominated
67th Primetime Emmy Awards	Outstanding Hairstyling for a Single-Camera Series	Francesca Paris, Lisa De Jesus, Sarah Stamp	Nominated
67th Primetime Emmy Awards	Outstanding Production Design for a Narrative Period Program (One Hour or More)	Bill Groom, Adam Scher, Carol Silverman	Won
