= To the Lost =

- Boardwalk Empire episode
- Episode no.: Season 2 Episode 12
- Directed by: Tim Van Patten
- Written by: Terence Winter
- Original air date: December 11, 2011
- Running time: 57 minutes

Guest appearances
- Charlie Cox as Owen Sleater; William Forsythe as Manny Horvitz; Dominic Chianese as Leander Whitlock; Julianne Nicholson as Esther Randolph; Erik LaRay Harvey as Dunn Purnsley; Robert Clohessy as Alderman Jim Neary; Victor Verhaeghe as Alderman Damien Fleming; Anatol Yusef as Meyer Lansky; Michael Cumpsty as Father Brennan; Adam Mucci as Deputy Raymond Halloran; Kevin O'Rourke as Mayor Edward Bader

Episode chronology
← Previous "Under God's Power She Flourishes"	Next → "Resolution"

"To the Lost" is the twelfth episode of the second season of HBO television series Boardwalk Empire and the season finale, which premiered on HBO December 11, 2011. The episode was written by series creator Terence Winter and directed by Tim Van Patten, both executive producers.

The episode received wide critical acclaim, particularly for Michael Pitt's performance, Tim Van Patten's direction and Terence Winter's writing.

== Plot ==
Jimmy attempts to make amends for betraying Nucky, despite knowing that Nucky will never forgive him. Aided by Richard, he ends the workers strike by kidnapping the Klansmen responsible for the raid on Chalky’s warehouse and delivering them to Chalky, along with compensation for the families of the men they killed. Jimmy asks Chalky to arrange a meeting with Nucky, during which he expresses a desire to make things right and blames Eli for the assassination attempt. Nucky asks Jimmy to sabotage the criminal charges against him. Jimmy destroys the Commodore’s will to ensure that he will inherit his estate, and forces Neary to write a statement implicating Eli at gunpoint; Jimmy and Richard then stage Neary's death as a suicide.

Mickey brokers a meeting between Nucky and Manny Horvitz, who suggests they partner up and kill Jimmy. Nucky, concerned that Margaret Schroeder will testify against him, proposes to her and admits that he is asking her to save his life. When she sees Nucky caring for Emily, who is still recovering from polio, Margaret agrees to marry him prior to the trial. The judge grants a mistrial given Neary's death and the recanting of other witness statements. Meanwhile, Congress announces its intention to supply the road appropriations funding Nucky needs to profit from his investment in a tract of land between Atlantic City and Philadelphia, which he plans to use for a lucrative construction deal. He asks Margaret to sign the land back over to him now that the threat of asset forfeiture has been lifted.

Jimmy spends a day taking his son to the beach and drinking with Richard while recounting war stories. Nucky approaches Eli and convinces him to plead guilty with the promise of minimal prison time. Eli lies to Nucky, claiming that he was not involved in planning the assassination attempt. Elsewhere, Luciano approaches Rothstein regarding heroin distribution. Nucky calls during the meeting to ask Rothstein for permission to kill Manny, but says that he is uncertain that he will do so.

Nucky calls Jimmy and arranges to meet him at the Atlantic City War Memorial, claiming to have captured Manny. Jimmy insists on going alone and unarmed to the meeting, correctly predicting that Nucky plans to kill him. He accepts his fate, stating he really died in the trenches, and tries to talk Nucky through the process. Nucky shoots him in the face, but initially fails to kill him outright. Standing over a mortally wounded Jimmy, Nucky coldly proclaims, "I am not seeking forgiveness." He then fires once more, killing Jimmy. As he dies, Jimmy flashes back to going over the top of a trench during the war. The following morning, Nucky lies to Margaret about his whereabouts, and his involvement in the murder, claiming that Jimmy had re-enlisted in the army. He then drives out to meet his fellow land buyers to celebrate their new fortune, while Margaret, without Nucky's knowledge, donates the land to her parish.

== Production ==
In that way, it really serves the storytelling in a big way. In another way, you're taking a stick of dynamite to a major character and a big part of the first two seasons' arc. Jimmy's obviously one of the co-leads of the series. For me, that's the challenge of what we do. Okay, now where do we go from here? You introduce new people, new conflicts and life goes on from there. It's alternately scary and challenging at the same time.

— Series creator, Terence Winter

When series creator Terence Winter and the other Boardwalk Empire writers were plotting the second season's storyline, they decided to have Nucky cross the line. "Once we started plotting the season out, when we were honest with ourselves, we said, if the idea was to bring Nucky from (Jimmy telling him) 'You can't be half a gangster anymore' to the point where he crosses the line and is engaging in gangster behavior himself," he said. They wrestled with the idea of killing off Pitt's character. "Once we started to come to that conclusion, there was a good number of months where we really wrestled with it, asking, 'Is there any way? Can he kill someone else? Let Jimmy off the hook?' And the honest answer kept coming back to 'No, this is it,'" he added. The storyline worked out for the writers in the end as, Winter stated, "Just given the fact that episodic TV being what it is, the audience is so in tune to the rhythm of things: Okay, well, they'll never kill a main character. If this happens, it'll happen in season five".

He spoke of the incest scene in the previous episode, "It came to us as season 1 was developing. Searching back in my memory of how even Gillian developed, I knew I wanted his mother to be a showgirl, so if she's a showgirl, she can't be 50 years old, she's gotta be younger. So she's a young woman, so she had him as a kid. Why don't we push that as far as we can go, she had him when she was 13 years old. And if she was a child herself, they would have a very odd relationship; he probably grew up in dance halls, and around a lot of naked showgirls, seen his mother naked a million times. This has just been a strange childhood for this guy." On Margaret's storyline, Winter spoke of Margaret's feeling of being "duped" by Nucky and his lies: "It's not just Jimmy. I think she felt completely duped. As soon as Nucky came home and said Jim Neary had committed suicide, she's been down this road before. I think she made her decision at this point, that this guy will never change. The whole sappy story about God and the family — it's not that she doesn't believe he loves her and the kids, because he does, but in terms of him learning any kind of lesson or changing in any way, I think she knows things are pretty much the same, if not worse." He continued, "The Jimmy thing at the end just caps it for her, she knows he's absolutely lying and that Jimmy didn't rejoin the Army. In giving away that land, signing the deed over, it's that all debts are paid to God." Winter also teased that Van Alden would return in Cicero, where Al Capone rose to power.

== Reception ==
=== Reviews ===
"To the Lost" received widespread critical acclaim from television critics.

=== Accolades ===
Tim Van Patten won the Primetime Emmy Award for Outstanding Directing for a Drama Series for this episode.
