= Members Only (The Sopranos) =

- The Sopranos episode
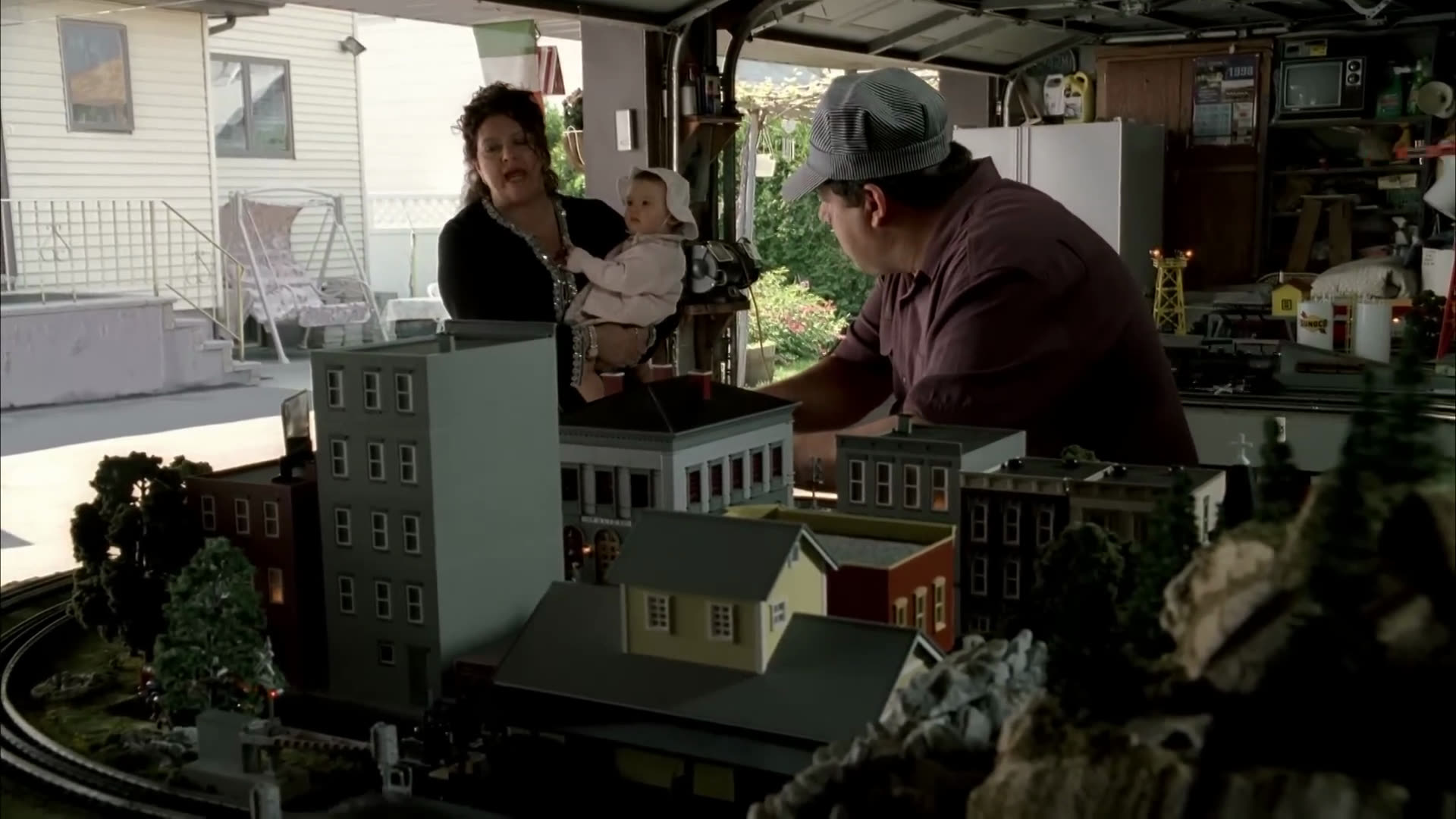
- Janice and Bobby Baccalieri with their new daughter
- Episode no.: Season 6 Episode 1
- Directed by: Tim Van Patten
- Written by: Terence Winter
- Cinematography by: Phil Abraham
- Production code: 601
- Original air date: March 12, 2006
- Running time: 52 minutes

Episode chronology
← Previous "All Due Respect"	Next → "Join the Club"
- The Sopranos season 6

"Members Only" is the 66th episode of the HBO series The Sopranos, and the first of the show's sixth season. Written by Terence Winter and directed by Tim Van Patten, it aired originally on March 12, 2006.

The episode was the most watched cable program and third most popular program on cable or broadcast television on its premiere date, with about 9.5 million viewers. Critical reception was highly positive.

== Starring ==
- James Gandolfini as Tony Soprano
- Lorraine Bracco as Dr. Jennifer Melfi
- Edie Falco as Carmela Soprano
- Michael Imperioli as Christopher Moltisanti
- Dominic Chianese as Corrado Soprano Jr.
- Steven Van Zandt as Silvio Dante
- Tony Sirico as Paulie Gualtieri
- Robert Iler as Anthony Soprano Jr.
- Jamie-Lynn Sigler as Meadow Soprano
- Aida Turturro as Janice Soprano Baccalieri
- Steven R. Schirripa as Bobby Baccalieri
- Vincent Curatola as Johnny Sack
- Frank Vincent as Phil Leotardo
- John Ventimiglia as Artie Bucco
- Dan Grimaldi as Patsy Parisi
- Joseph R. Gannascoli as Vito Spatafore
- Toni Kalem as Angie Bonpensiero

=== Guest starring ===
- Jerry Adler as Hesh Rabkin

=== Also guest starring ===
- Drea de Matteo as Adriana La Cerva
- Frankie Valli as Rusty Millio
- Robert Funaro as Eugene Pontecorvo
- Tom Aldredge as Hugh DeAngelis
- Sharon Angela as Rosalie Aprile
- John Bianco as Gerry Torciano
- Denise Borino as Ginny Sacrimoni
- Joe Caniano as Teddy Spirodakis
- Carl Capotorto as Little Paulie
- Max Casella as Benny Fazio
- Greg D'Agostino as Jimmy Lauria
- Suzanne Di Donna as Deanne Pontecorvo
- Danielle Di Vecchio as Barbara Soprano Giglione
- Will Janowitz as Finn DeTrolio
- Michael Kelly as Agent Goddard
- George Loros as Raymond Curto
- Lou Martini Jr. as Anthony Infante
- Arthur J. Nascarella as Carlo Gervasi
- Matt Pepper as Agent Gosling
- Anthony J. Ribustello as Dante Greco
- Thomas Russo as Robbie Pontecorvo
- Matt Servitto as Agent Dwight Harris
- Daniel Stewart Sherman as Ron Senkowski
- David Shumbris as Eli Kaplan
- Tracey Silver as Beth Kaplan
- Lenny Venito as James "Murmur" Zancone
- Karen Young as Agent Robyn Sanseverino
- Nick Annunziata as Eddie Pietro
- Ai Kiyono as Sushi Waitress
- Lisa Sue Miller as Bada Bing Waitress
- Brianna and Kimberly Laughlin as Domenica Baccalieri
- Grace Van Patten as Ally Pontecorvo
- Cristin Milioti as Catherine Sacrimoni (appears in photograph, uncredited)

== Synopsis ==
Nearly two years have passed. Janice Soprano is raising a new daughter with Bobby Baccalieri, who has taken up model railroading as a hobby. Meadow Soprano continues her relationship with Finn DeTrolio. A.J. Soprano is now attending college. Adriana La Cerva is remembered by a worrying Carmela Soprano. Vito Spatafore is thinner and is now a spokesperson for a weight loss company; he is Tony Soprano's best earner and is ambitious. Phil Leotardo, now the acting boss of the Lupertazzi crime family, is taking care of business for the imprisoned Johnny Sack.

In Brooklyn, Hesh Rabkin and his son-in-law Eli Kaplan are assaulted by Lupertazzi associates. Trying to escape, Eli is knocked down by a hit-and-run driver and seriously injured. At Hesh's request, Tony tries to reach out directly to Johnny through his optometrist brother-in-law, Anthony Infante, but Johnny is only paying attention to his immediate family's financial troubles. Tony, Vito and Christopher, now a capo in the Soprano family, meet with Phil and Gerry "The Hairdo" Torciano. Disputes between Tony and Phil are resolved, and it is explained that the New York associates were protecting Gerry's area and did not know Eli was associated with the Sopranos; they agree to pay Eli $50,000 as compensation.

Carmela's construction of her spec house is suspended due to a "stop order" issued by a building inspector because improper lumber has been used. Her father, Hugh De Angelis, thinks an inspector he used to know would waive the requirement, but his contact has retired. Carmela repeatedly asks Tony to see if he can get the stop order lifted, but he keeps putting it off.

Eugene Pontecorvo inherits $2 million and desires to retire with his family to Florida. Bearing gifts, he goes to Tony to ask permission. Tony reminds Eugene that he took an oath. Later, Eugene gives him a cut of the inheritance. At Chris' behest, he then kills a debtor; in return, Chris says, "I'll put in a good word to T about the Florida thing." Tony's decision is relayed through Silvio: "Your Florida thing. That's a no-go." Eugene is also an informant for the FBI and has become more valuable to the Bureau since the death of Ray Curto; they, too, refuse to let him leave New Jersey. With his wife bitter and his son using heroin, Eugene hangs himself.

Uncle Junior's mind is deteriorating. Tony helps him look for some money he thinks he buried in his backyard thirty years previously, but they find nothing. Both Dr. Melfi and Janice suggest a retirement home or assisted living for him, but Tony forcefully refuses. One afternoon, Junior is particularly agitated, and Tony goes to his house because no one else is free to look after him. While Tony is cooking dinner, Junior, thinking he is a long-dead mobster, shoots him in the stomach. While Junior cowers in a closet upstairs, Tony manages to dial 911 before passing out.

== First appearances ==
The episode marks the first appearances of:

- Agent Ron Goddard: FBI Agent Harris' new partner working counter-terrorism.
- Anthony Infante: Ginny Sacrimoni's brother, who owns an eyewear store.
- Domenica "Nica" Baccalieri: Janice and Bobby's 12-month-old daughter.
- James "Murmur" Zancone: Christopher's associate and Alcoholics Anonymous sponsor who Christopher says is also good at forging documents.
- Gerry "The Hairdo" Torciano: soldier and acting capo in the Lupertazzi crime family and Phil Leotardo's protégé after his brother's death; responsible for Phil Leotardo's business in Brooklyn following his promotion to acting boss.

== Deceased ==
- Raymond Curto: stroke
- Teddy Spirodakis: shot by Eugene in a diner
- Eugene Pontecorvo: suicide by hanging
- Dick Barone: (offscreen) owner of Barone Sanitation; died of Amyotrophic lateral sclerosis (Lou Gehrig's disease).

== Title reference ==
- Eugene Pontecorvo is shown wearing a "Members Only" jacket and is made fun of for it by Vito Spatafore.
- It could refer to the Mafia code of being a member-only and never a retiree, just what Eugene Pontecorvo attempted to become.

== Production ==
- To combat leaked storylines, the writers and Chase used fake scenes to confuse the set. The scene in which Uncle Junior shoots Tony was also shot with Phil Leotardo in a window shooting at Tony instead.
- The "traditional" season premiere sequence involving The Star-Ledger newspaper is not featured. Instead, a montage of the characters is featured showcasing what has happened in the past two years. A new version of the scene with the delivered newspaper appears in the fifth episode of the season, "Mr. & Mrs. John Sacrimoni Request."
- Frank Vincent (Phil Leotardo), Dan Grimaldi (Patsy Parisi), Joseph Gannascoli (Vito Spatafore), and Toni Kalem (Angie Bonpensiero) are promoted to starring cast and are now billed in the opening credits but only for the episodes in which they appear. Of the four, only Frank Vincent is billed in an individual credit; the others are paired (although Dan Grimaldi would be credited individually in the second part of Season 6).
- Jamie-Lynn Sigler is again billed by her original last name in the opening credits, following her separation from her agent and husband, A.J. DiScala, after Season 5 ended.
- Despite the episode's focus on his character, Robert Funaro (Eugene Pontecorvo) does not appear in the opening credits. Season 3 is the only season in which he does.
- In the original broadcast of this episode (March 12, 2006), no previews for the next episode were shown in order to keep the aftermath of Tony's shooting a mystery.
- Filming for this episode took place in May 2005.

== References to prior episodes ==
- Pussy Malanga, the man Uncle Junior was convinced is after him and whom he eventually mistakes Tony for, is the same mobster Uncle Junior wanted to kill in Artie Bucco's first restaurant in the pilot episode.
- Dr. Melfi recalls that Tony grabbed a pillow in order to smother his mother in "I Dream of Jeannie Cusamano," but Tony denies this, saying he only grabbed the pillow to occupy his hands.
- Dr. Melfi calls the home that Tony put his mother in a "retirement community" and Tony corrects her and calls it a nursing home. Before this, whenever somebody called it a nursing home, Tony always corrected them and called it a retirement community.
- Johnny Sack considers selling the Maserati he bought in "Marco Polo."

== Other cultural references ==
- Junior tries to retrieve money from a robbery of a Bohack's in the 1970s.
- Tony refers to his forgetful Uncle Junior as "Knucklehead Smiff."
- Vito asks Agent Harris if he had lost weight due to the Atkins diet.
- When Eugene proposes retiring, he cites the precedent set by "Joe Bananas" (Joseph Bonanno).
- When Eugene's conversation with his wife is interrupted by a call on his cellphone, she says he is responding to "His Master's Voice".
- The movie Junior watches is Paths of Glory, a 1957 war movie directed by Stanley Kubrick.
- When Junior says Pussy Malanga is prank calling his house Tony says they will get FBI director J. Edgar Hoover to investigate.
- Tony jokes that it's the Year of the Rat, although that would not come until 2008–09.
- Tony calls AJ "Joe College."

== Music ==
- The song featured in the opening scene and closing credits is "Seven Souls" by Bill Laswell. It features William S. Burroughs reading from his novel The Western Lands. Creator David Chase describes the song as featuring a strong foreboding tone and themes touching the concepts of death and resurrection. Chase had originally tried to use this song for the pilot episode of The Sopranos. It finally ended up being used on the show in this episode, in the opening montage of the premiere of the final season, eight years later.
- The song featured in the scene where Tony and Carmela are dining at the sushi restaurant is "Ride a White Horse" by Goldfrapp.
- "Dreaming" by Blondie plays on the car radio when Eugene is returning home from his murder job.
- The song playing when Junior shoots Tony is "Comes Love" by Artie Shaw, sung by Helen Forrest.

== Reception ==
On its premiere date, "Members Only" had about 9.5 million viewers leading all of cable television and third highest among all television programs on March 12, 2006.

"Members Only" was widely praised. Television Without Pity graded the episode with an A+. Its review found irony in Christopher Moltisanti mocking Phil's eyebrows. For the San Francisco Chronicle, Tim Goodman called the first four episodes of season six "a magnificent bonfire of assured creativity".

Entertainment Weekly had an A− grade, with Gillian Flynn praising the episode for "quick glimpses of unease and loneliness", as opposed to violent scenes that "lost their original shock value". The New York Times praised the episode for sticking with themes that made the show appealing, wrote Alessandra Stanley: "Big psychological themes are seamlessly woven into banal details that are comic until they suddenly turn and explode into brutish acts of violence." Los Angeles Times critic Paul Brownfield speculated that this season would focus on Tony's "inner and outer worlds" and praised this episode as "the best work from Gandolfini and the equally formidable Falco". Alan Sepinwall of The Star-Ledger highlighted the "gut-wrenching" shooting of Tony, noting that "Tony's past is catching up to him in dangerous ways." However, he also commented that the episode "traded a little too much" on the stories of minor characters.

=== Awards ===
- On August 27, 2006, Terence Winter, the episode's writer, won the Primetime Emmy Award for Outstanding Writing for a Drama Series at the 58th Primetime Emmy Awards.
