= Terence Winter =

American screenwriter (born 1960)

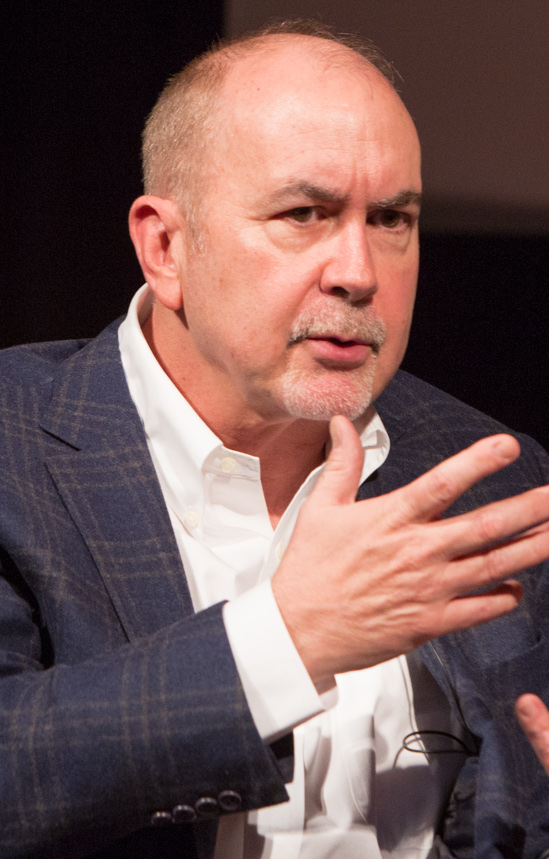
- Winter in 2015
- Born: Terence Patrick Winter; October 2, 1960 (age 66); New York City, U.S.
- Education: New York University (BA); St. John's University (JD)
- Occupations: Screenwriter; producer
- Years active: 1995–present

Terence Patrick Winter (born October 2, 1960) is an American writer and producer of television and film. He was the creator, writer, and executive producer of the HBO television series Boardwalk Empire (2010–2014). Before creating Boardwalk Empire, Winter was a writer and executive producer for the HBO television series The Sopranos, from the show's second to sixth and final season (2000–2007).

In 2013, Winter wrote the screenplay to Martin Scorsese's The Wolf of Wall Street for which he received Academy Award, BAFTA Award, and Writers Guild of America Award nominations for Best Adapted Screenplay. He was also the co-creator, writer and executive producer of another HBO television drama series, Vinyl (2016), which ran for one season. He is an executive producer and writer on the Paramount+ crime series Tulsa King with Taylor Sheridan.

== Early life and education ==
Winter was born in New York City. He grew up in a working-class family in Marine Park, Brooklyn. He went to a vocational high school in Brooklyn, studying to be an auto mechanic. He studied at the New York University, where, in 1984, he received a bachelor's degree in political science with a minor in journalism. He went on to study at St. John's University School of Law, and received a J.D. in 1988,, and became a member of the bars of New York State and Connecticut. He practiced law for two years in New York City before moving to Los Angeles in 1991 to pursue a screenwriting career. During that time, he also performed as a stand-up comedian. He eventually won a spot in the Warner Bros. Television Writers' Workshop, and later joined the writing staff of the Fox series The Great Defender, starring Michael Rispoli, later a Sopranos cast member.

== Career ==
=== 1995–2000: Early work ===
Prior to The Sopranos, Winter wrote for the series Sister, Sister, Xena: Warrior Princess, The Cosby Mysteries, Flipper, Diagnosis: Murder, Charlie Grace, DiResta, and The PJs.

=== 2000–2007: The Sopranos ===
Winter joined the HBO series The Sopranos as a writer in its second season and ultimately wrote or co-wrote 25 episodes.

In 2001, together with Tim Van Patten, Winter won both the Writers Guild Award and the Edgar Award for the episode "Pine Barrens", directed by Steve Buscemi. In 2004, Winter won two Emmy Awards, one as Executive Producer for The Sopranos for Outstanding Drama Series, and one for Best Writing in a Drama Series for the episode "Long Term Parking". He won another writing Emmy in 2006 for the episode "Members Only". Also in 2006, Winter wrote and directed the episode "Walk Like a Man" for the show's final season. Winter won his second Writers Guild Award and his fourth Emmy in 2007 when The Sopranos won Outstanding Drama Series. He won his third Writers Guild Award and the Pen USA award for his episode "The Second Coming". The Sopranos also won The Norman Felton Award for Outstanding Producer of Episodic Television Drama in 2004 and 2007.

Winter wrote the screenplay for the 2005 film Get Rich or Die Tryin' and its accompanying video game 50 Cent: Bulletproof. In 2007, he wrote and produced the film Brooklyn Rules, directed by Michael Corrente.

=== 2010–2014: Boardwalk Empire and The Wolf of Wall Street ===
Winter created the HBO series Boardwalk Empire and also served as showrunner and head writer, with fifteen episodes credited to him, including: "Boardwalk Empire", "The Ivory Tower", "A Return to Normalcy", "21", "Two Boats and a Lifeguard", "To the Lost", "Resolution", "The Pony", "Margate Sands", "Acres of Diamonds", "William Wilson", "Farewell Daddy Blues", "The Good Listener", "Cuanto", and "Eldorado".

Winter and Boardwalk Empire won a Writers Guild of America Award for Best Writing in a New Series and he was nominated for Best Writing in a Dramatic Series 2011–2013. Boardwalk Empire won the Golden Globe Award for Best Television Series Drama in 2011 and was nominated in 2012 and 2013. In addition, Steve Buscemi won for Best Actor in a Dramatic Series and Kelly Macdonald was nominated for Best Supporting Actress in a Series, Miniseries or Motion Picture Made for Television. Boardwalk Empire was in the American Film Institute's Top Ten List for TV in 2010 and 2011. The cast of Boardwalk Empire won the Screen Actors Guild Award for Best Ensemble in a Drama Series, while Steve Buscemi won the Screen Actors Guild Award for Outstanding Performance by a Male Actor in a Drama Series and Martin Scorsese won the Directors Guild Award for Outstanding Directorial Achievement in Dramatic Series. Boardwalk Empire was nominated for the Emmy for Outstanding Drama Series in both 2011 and 2012. In addition, Boardwalk Empire won The Norman Felton Award for Outstanding Producer of Episodic Television Drama in 2012 and was nominated for BAFTA Best International Television in 2011.

In 2007, Winter began working on the screenplay for The Wolf of Wall Street, based on the memoir by Jordan Belfort, following a conversation with Martin Scorsese. After several years of development, studio transitions and changes in financiers, Red Granite Pictures greenlit the project for preproduction. Winter, in collaboration with Leonardo DiCaprio and Scorsese, completed the finalized shooting script in 2012, with principal photography commencing later that year. The film, directed by Scorsese, released in December 2013 to both critical and commercial success, earning Winter his first Academy Award nomination for Best Adapted Screenplay.

=== 2016–present: Vinyl and Tulsa King ===
Winter served as the co-creator, writer, executive producer, and showrunner of the HBO period musical drama series Vinyl, which reunited him with Boardwalk Empire actor Bobby Cannavale and director Martin Scorsese. Despite being picked up for a second season, Winter left his position as showrunner due to "creative differences" in April 2016 and was replaced by executive producer Scott Z. Burns. In June 2016, HBO canceled the series.

Winter was the showrunner of the first season of the 2022 Paramount+ series Tulsa King. After departing the showrunner position, he later returned to the series as a writer and executive producer.

== Filmography ==
=== Film ===
Year	Title	Writer	Producer	Notes
2005	Get Rich or Die Tryin'	Yes	No	
2007	Brooklyn Rules	Yes	Yes	
2013	The Wolf of Wall Street	Yes	No	Nominated – Academy Award for Best Adapted Screenplay; Nominated – Writers Guild of America Award for Best Adapted Screenplay
2015	The Audition	Yes	Yes	Short film
2023	Shooting Stars	No	Yes	
2024	Bob Marley: One Love	Yes	No	

=== Television ===
Year	Title	Director	Writer	Producer	Notes
1995–1996	Flipper	No	Yes	Yes	
1995–1997	Xena: Warrior Princess	No	Yes	No	
1995	The Cosby Mysteries	No	Yes	No	
1995	The Great Defender	No	Yes	No	
1996–1997	Sister, Sister	No	Yes	Yes	
1998	Diagnosis: Murder	No	Yes	No	
1998	Soldier of Fortune, Inc.	No	No	No	Creative consultant
2000	The PJs	No	No	Yes	
2000–2007	The Sopranos	Yes	Yes	Yes	Primetime Emmy Award for Outstanding Drama Series (2004, 2007); Primetime Emmy Award for Outstanding Writing for a Drama Series (2004, 2006); Writers Guild of America Award for Television: Episodic Drama (2001, 2007); Writers Guild of America Award for Television: Dramatic Series (2006); Nominated – Primetime Emmy Award for Outstanding Drama Series (2000, 2001, 2003, 2006); Nominated – Primetime Emmy Award for Outstanding Writing for a Drama Series (2001, 2003, 2004, 2007); Nominated – Writers Guild of America Award for Television: Episodic Drama (2000, 2004); Nominated – Writers Guild of America Award for Television: Dramatic Series (2007)
2010–2014	Boardwalk Empire	No	Yes	Yes	Also creator Writers Guild of America Award for Television: New Series (2010); Nominated – Primetime Emmy Award for Outstanding Drama Series (2011, 2012); Nominated – Writers Guild of America Award for Television: Dramatic Series (2010, 2011, 2012)
2016	Vinyl	No	Yes	Yes	Also co-creator
2022–2024, 2026–present	Tulsa King	No	Yes	Yes	Showrunner (season 1); Head writer (seasons 2 and 4)
