= Tim Van Patten =

American television director and former actor (born 1959)

- Born: Timothy Van Patten; June 10, 1959 (age 67); New York, New York, U.S.
- Occupations: Director; actor; screenwriter; producer
- Years active: 1978–present
- Spouse: Wendy Rossmeyer (m. 1996)
- Children: 3, including Grace and Anna
- Relatives: Dick Van Patten (half-brother); Joyce Van Patten (half-sister); Vincent Van Patten (nephew); Nels Van Patten (nephew); Talia Balsam (niece)
- Awards: Full list

Timothy Van Patten (born June 10, 1959) is an American television director, screenwriter, producer, and former actor. He has received numerous accolades including two Emmy Awards, a Peabody Award, and two Directors Guild of America Awards, as well as nominations for two BAFTA Awards.

Van Patten started his career as an actor portraying Mario "Salami" Pettrino on The White Shadow from 1978 to 1981. He also played the villainous teenager Peter Stegman in Class of 1984 (1982), Max Keller on The Master (1984), and Sergeant Andy Wojeski in True Blue (1989–1990). Beginning in the early 1990s, he left acting to pursue a directing career full time.

Van Patten received two Primetime Emmy Awards for Outstanding Limited Series for the HBO limited series The Pacific (2010), and Outstanding Directing for a Drama Series for the HBO drama series Boardwalk Empire episode "To the Lost" (2012). He also received Emmy nominations for his work on Sex and the City, The Sopranos, and Game of Thrones. Van Patten also directed episodes for Deadwood, Rome, and The Wire. He directed the Netflix series Black Mirror episode "Hang the DJ" (2018), and several episodes of the HBO legal drama series Perry Mason (2020).

== Early life ==
Van Patten was born in Brooklyn, New York, to Richard Byron Van Patten (1907–1985) and his second wife Eleanor della Gatta Van Patten and grew up in Massapequa, New York. He graduated from Massapequa High School in 1977, in the same class as musician Brian Setzer and football player Brian Baldinger.

== Career ==
=== 1978–1990: Acting career ===
Van Patten started his career as an actor in film and television. He first gained prominence for his role as Mario "Salami" Pettrino in the CBS drama series The White Shadow from 1978 to 1981 appearing in 54 episodes. He made his feature film debut in the Mark Lester directed crime thriller Class of 1984 portraying Peter Stegman, the villainous teenager. He acted alongside Michael J. Fox and Roddy McDowell. The film received positive reviews with Roger Ebert writing, "[the film] is raw, offensive, vulgar, and violent, but it contains the sparks of talent and wit, and it is acted and directed by people who cared to make it special." Van Patten then played Max Keller in the NBC action-adventure series The Master (1984). His other film roles include Joey in the World War II science fiction film Zone Troopers (1985), J.T. in the comedy film The Wrong Guys (1988), and Father John Durham in the horror film Catacombs (1988). He played Andy Wojeski in the NBC crime drama series True Blue from 1989 to 1990.

=== 1991–2001: Early directing work ===
Following the cancellation of True Blue Patten quit acting and made his directorial film debut with the series Home Fires in 1991. His other early credits include directing two episodes of the primetime soap opera Central Park West (1995-1996), an episode of the Fox science fiction series The Visitor (1998), four episodes for the UPN action crime drama series The Sentinel from 1996 to 1998, and the CBS drama series Promised Land also 1996 to 1998. He gained prominence directing episodes for the NBC police drama Homicide: Life on the Street (1995-1999), and for the Fox police drama New York Undercover (1997-1998), both of which were critically acclaimed. Van Patten directed 31 episodes of the CBS drama series Touched by an Angel from 1994 to 2000.

=== 2002–present: Work with HBO ===
Van Patten gained greater prominence as a director for a string of critically and commercially successful HBO projects. He received four nominations for the Primetime Emmy Award for Outstanding Directing for a Drama Series for the HBO crime drama series The Sopranos (1999-2007) episodes "Amour Fou" (2001), "Whoever Did This" (2002), "Long Term Parking" (2004), and "Members Only" (2006). During this time he received acclaim for directing numerous episodes of the David Simon crime series The Wire, the Darren Star created romantic comedy series Sex and the City, the John Milius created historical drama series Rome, and the David Milch created Western series Deadwood.

He was nominated for the Primetime Emmy Award for Outstanding Directing for a Limited or Anthology Series or Movie HBO miniseries The Pacific (2009) for which he won the Primetime Emmy Award for Outstanding Limited Series alongside producers Tom Hanks and Steven Spielberg. During this time he directed two episodes for the HBO fantasy series Game of Thrones, "Winter is Coming" and "The Kingsroad" receiving a Primetime Emmy Award nomination for the former. Van Patten went on to win the Primetime Emmy Award for Outstanding Directing for a Drama Series for directing the 2011 Boardwalk Empire episode "To the Lost". He was also nominated for the episodes "Margate Sands" (2012), "Farewell Daddy Blues" (2013), "Eldorado" (2014).

He directed the critically acclaimed episode of Black Mirror, "Hang the DJ" (2017). He also directed and served as an executive producer of the HBO legal drama series Perry Mason (2020).

== Personal life ==
Van Patten is the half-brother of Dick Van Patten and Joyce Van Patten, and the uncle of Vincent Van Patten and Talia Balsam.

His daughters are actresses Anna and Grace Van Patten.

== Filmography ==
=== Director ===
Year	Title	Notes	Refs.
1994–2000	Touched by an Angel	31 episodes	
1995–1999	Homicide: Life on the Street	2 episodes	
1996–1998	Promised Land	3 episodes	
1997–1998	New York Undercover	3 episodes	
1999	Now and Again	Episode: "Nothing to Fear, But Nothing to Fear"	
1999–2007	The Sopranos	20 episodes Writer: "Pine Barrens"	
2001–2003	Ed	5 episodes	
2002	Pasadena	Episode: "Puppy Love"	
2002–2004	The Wire	3 episodes	
2003–2004	Sex and the City	3 episodes	
2003	Keen Eddie	Episode: "The Amazing Larry Dunn"	
2005	Into the West	Miniseries; Episode: "Casualties of War"	
2005	Deadwood	Episode: "Childish Things"	
2005–2007	Rome	2 episodes	
2010	The Pacific	3 episodes; also supervising producer	
2011	Game of Thrones	2 episodes: "Winter Is Coming" / "The Kingsroad"	
2010–2014	Boardwalk Empire	10 episodes Writer: "Home"; Executive producer 2010-2014	
2017	Black Mirror	Episode: "Hang the DJ"	
2020	Perry Mason	5 Episodes; Executive producer	
2024	Masters of the Air	1 episode	
2024	Franklin	8 Episodes	

=== Actor ===
Year	Title	Role	Notes	Refs.
1978–1981	The White Shadow	Mario "Salami" Pettrino	54 episodes	
1982	Class of 1984	Peter Stegman	Film	
1984	The Master	Max Keller	13 episodes	
1984	St. Elsewhere	Dean	3 episodes	
	Escape from El Diablo	Pauli	Film	
1985	Zone Troopers	Joey	Film	
1988	The Wrong Guys	J.T.	Film	
1988	Catacombs	Father John Durham	Film	
1989–1990	True Blue	Sergeant Andy Wojeski	12 episodes	

== Awards and nominations ==
In 2001, together with Terence Winter, Van Patten won both the Edgar Award and Writers Guild of America Award for Episodic Drama for The Sopranos episode "Pine Barrens," directed by Steve Buscemi.

Year	Association	Category	Nominated work	Result	Ref.
2001	Primetime Emmy Award	Outstanding Writing for a Drama Series	The Sopranos (episode: "Pine Barrens")	Nominated	
2001	Primetime Emmy Award	Outstanding Directing for a Drama Series	The Sopranos (episode: "Amour Fou")	Nominated	
2003	Primetime Emmy Award	Outstanding Directing for a Drama Series	The Sopranos (episode: "Whoever Did This")	Nominated	
2004	Primetime Emmy Award	Outstanding Directing for a Drama Series	The Sopranos (episode: "Long Term Parking")	Nominated	
2004	Primetime Emmy Award	Outstanding Directing for a Comedy Series	Sex and the City (episode: "An American Girl in Paris")	Nominated	
2006	Primetime Emmy Award	Outstanding Directing for a Drama Series	The Sopranos (episode: "Members Only")	Nominated	
2010	Primetime Emmy Award	Outstanding Limited Series	The Pacific	Won	
2010	Primetime Emmy Award	Outstanding Directing for a Limited Series	The Pacific (episode: "Okinawa")	Nominated	
2011	Primetime Emmy Award	Outstanding Drama Series	Boardwalk Empire (season 1)	Nominated	
2011	Primetime Emmy Award	Outstanding Directing for a Drama Series	Game of Thrones (episode: "Winter Is Coming")	Nominated	
2012	Primetime Emmy Award	Outstanding Drama Series	Boardwalk Empire (season 2)	Nominated	
2012	Primetime Emmy Award	Outstanding Directing for a Drama Series	Boardwalk Empire (episode: "To the Lost")	Won	
2013	Primetime Emmy Award	Outstanding Directing for a Drama Series	Boardwalk Empire (episode: "Margate Sands")	Nominated	
2014	Primetime Emmy Award	Outstanding Directing for a Drama Series	Boardwalk Empire (episode: "Farewell Daddy Blues")	Nominated	
2015	Primetime Emmy Award	Outstanding Directing for a Drama Series	Boardwalk Empire (episode: "Eldorado")	Nominated	
