= List of awards and nominations received by David Foster =

David Foster is a Canadian musician, record producer, composer, songwriter, and arranger.

== Grammy Awards ==
The Grammy Awards are awarded annually by the National Academy of Recording Arts and Sciences in the United States for outstanding achievements in the record industry. Foster has won 16 awards from 47 nominations.

| Year | Role | Nominated work | Performer(s) | Award | Result | Ref. |
|---|---|---|---|---|---|---|
| 1980 | Writer | "After the Love Has Gone" | Earth, Wind & Fire | Song of the Year | Nominated | |
| 1980 | Writer | "After the Love Has Gone" | Earth, Wind & Fire | Best Rhythm & Blues Song | Won | |
| 1980 | Arranger | "After the Love Has Gone" | Earth, Wind & Fire | Best Instrumental Arrangement Accompanying Vocalist(s) | Nominated | |
| 1981 | Writer | Urban Cowboy: Original Motion Picture Soundtrack | Various artists | Best Album of Original Score Written for a Motion Picture or a Television Special | Nominated | |
| 1983 | Producer | Dreamgirls: Original Broadway Cast Album | Various artists | Best Cast Show Album | Won | |
| 1983 | Producer | — | — | Producer of the Year, Non-Classical | Nominated | |
| 1984 | Producer | "Mornin'" | Al Jarreau | Best Instrumental Arrangement Accompanying Vocalist(s) | Nominated | |
| 1985 | Producer | "Hard Habit to Break" | Chicago | Record of the Year | Nominated | |
| 1985 | Producer | "Hard Habit to Break" | Chicago | Best Instrumental Arrangement Accompanying Vocalist(s) | Won | |
| 1985 | Arranger | "Hard Habit to Break" | Chicago | Best Vocal Arrangement for Two or More Voices | Nominated | |
| 1985 | Arranger | "What About Me?" | Kenny Rogers | Best Vocal Arrangement for Two or More Voices | Nominated | |
| 1985 | Writer | Ghostbusters: Original Soundtrack Album | Various artists | Best Album of Original Score Written for a Motion Picture or a Television Special | Nominated | |
| 1985 | Producer | — | — | Producer of the Year, Non-Classical | Won | |
| 1986 | Producer | We Are the World | Various artists | Album of the Year | Nominated | |
| 1986 | Producer | "Through the Fire" | Chaka Khan | Best Rhythm & Blues Song | Nominated | |
| 1986 | Producer | "Through the Fire" | Chaka Khan | Best Instrumental Arrangement Accompanying Vocalist(s) | Nominated | |
| 1986 | Performer | "Love Theme from St. Elmo's Fire" | David Foster | Best Pop Instrumental Performance | Nominated | |
| 1986 | Writer | "Love Theme from St. Elmo's Fire" | David Foster | Best Instrumental Composition | Nominated | |
| 1986 | Writer | St. Elmo's Fire: Music From The Original Motion Picture Soundtrack | Various artists | Best Album of Original Score Written for a Motion Picture or a Television Special | Nominated | |
| 1986 | Producer | — | — | Producer of the Year, Non-Classical | Nominated | |
| 1987 | Performer | David Foster | David Foster | Best Pop Instrumental Performance | Nominated | |
| 1987 | Arranger | "Somewhere" | Barbra Streisand | Best Instrumental Arrangement Accompanying Vocalist(s) | Won | |
| 1987 | Producer | — | — | Producer of the Year, Non-Classical | Nominated | |
| 1989 | Writer | "Winter Games" | David Foster | Best Instrumental Composition | Nominated | |
| 1989 | Performer | The Symphony Sessions | David Foster | Best Performance Music Video | Nominated | |
| 1992 | Producer | "Unforgettable" | Natalie Cole and Nat King Cole | Record of the Year | Won | |
| 1992 | Producer | Unforgettable… with Love | Natalie Cole | Album of the Year | Won | |
| 1992 | Producer | — | — | Producer of the Year, Non-Classical | Won | |
| 1994 | Producer | "I Will Always Love You" | Whitney Houston | Record of the Year | Won | |
| 1994 | Producer | The Bodyguard: Original Soundtrack Album | Various artists | Album of the Year | Won | |
| 1994 | Writer | "I Have Nothing" | Whitney Houston | Best Song Written Specifically for a Motion Picture or Television | Nominated | |
| 1994 | Arranger | "I Have Nothing" | Whitney Houston | Best Instrumental Arrangement Accompanying Vocalist(s) | Nominated | |
| 1994 | Arranger | "When I Fall in Love" | Celine Dion and Clive Griffin | Best Instrumental Arrangement Accompanying Vocalist(s) | Won | |
| 1994 | Arranger | "Some Enchanted Evening" | Barbra Streisand | Best Instrumental Arrangement Accompanying Vocalist(s) | Nominated | |
| 1994 | Producer | — | — | Producer of the Year, Non-Classical | Won | |
| 1996 | Producer | HIStory: Past, Present and Future, Book I | Michael Jackson | Album of the Year | Nominated | |
| 1997 | Producer | "Because You Loved Me" | Celine Dion | Record of the Year | Nominated | |
| 1997 | Producer | Falling into You | Celine Dion | Album of the Year | Won | |
| 1997 | Arranger | "When I Fall in Love" | Natalie Cole and Nat King Cole | Best Instrumental Arrangement Accompanying Vocalist(s) | Won | |
| 1997 | Producer | — | — | Producer of the Year, Non-Classical | Nominated | |
| 2000 | Arranger | "The Prayer" | Celine Dion and Andrea Bocelli | Best Instrumental Arrangement Accompanying Vocalist(s) | Nominated | |
| 2005 | Arranger | "Summertime" | Renee Olstead | Best Instrumental Arrangement Accompanying Vocalist(s) | Nominated | |
| 2006 | Producer | It's Time | Michael Bublé | Best Traditional Pop Vocal Album | Nominated | |
| 2006 | Arranger | "Can't Buy Me Love" | Michael Bublé | Best Instrumental Arrangement Accompanying Vocalist(s) | Nominated | |
| 2008 | Producer | Call Me Irresponsible | Michael Bublé | Best Traditional Pop Vocal Album | Won | |
| 2010 | Arranger | "A Change Is Gonna Come" | Seal | Best Instrumental Arrangement Accompanying Vocalist(s) | Nominated | |
| 2011 | Producer | Crazy Love | Michael Bublé | Best Traditional Pop Vocal Album | Won | |

== Academy Award ==
Academy Awards, also known as the Oscars, are awarded annually by the Academy of Motion Picture Arts and Sciences (AMPAS) to recognize excellence of professionals in the film industry, including directors, actors, and writers.

| Year | Role | Nominated work | Performer(s) | Award | Result | Ref. |
|---|---|---|---|---|---|---|
| 1986 | Writer | "Glory of Love" from The Karate Kid, Part II | Peter Cetera | Best Original Song | Nominated | |
| 1992 | Writer | "I Have Nothing" from The Bodyguard | Whitney Houston | Best Original Song | Nominated | |
| 1998 | Writer | "The Prayer" from Quest for Camelot | Celine Dion and Andrea Bocelli | Best Original Song | Nominated | |

== Golden Globe Award ==
Golden Globe Awards are awarded annually by the Hollywood Foreign Press Association (HFPA) to recognize excellence in film and television, both domestic and foreign.

| Year | Role | Nominated work | Performer(s) | Award | Result | Ref. |
|---|---|---|---|---|---|---|
| 1986 | Writer | "Glory of Love" from The Karate Kid, Part II | Peter Cetera | Best Original Song | Nominated | |
| 1987 | Writer | "The Secret of My Success" from The Secret of My Success | Night Ranger | Best Original Song | Nominated | |
| 1998 | Writer | "The Prayer" from Quest for Camelot | Celine Dion and Andrea Bocelli | Best Original Song | Won | |

== Drama Desk Award Nomination ==
He was nominated for a Drama Desk Award for composing Boop! The Musical.
