= Mark Romanek videography =

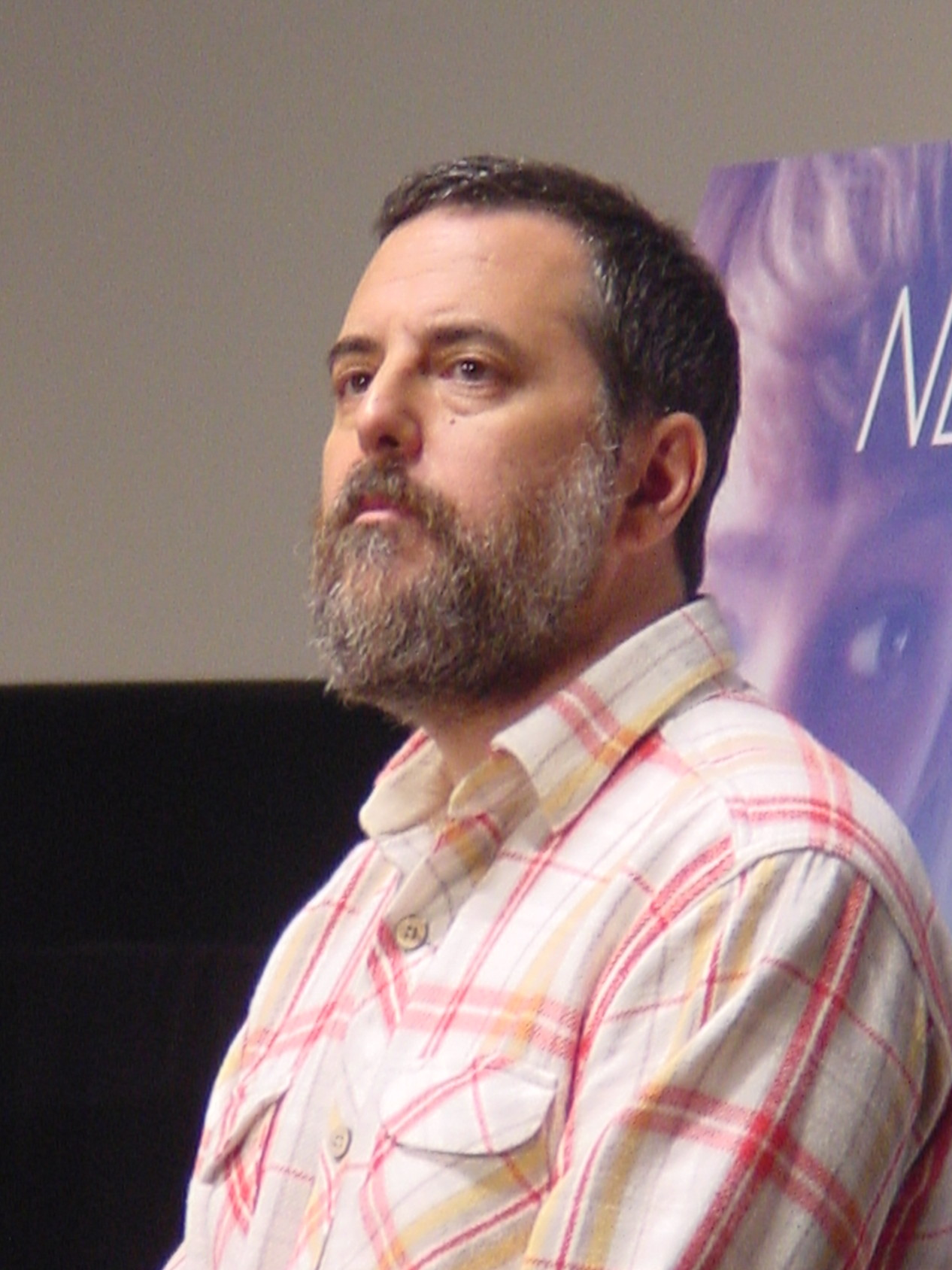
Romanek at the 2010 Tokyo International Film Festival

American filmmaker Mark Romanek directed his first music video in 1986, for The The's "Sweet Bird of Truth". He earned his first MTV Video Music Award for Best Direction nomination for "Free Your Mind", performed by En Vogue, in 1993. Romanek later directed "Closer" for the industrial rock band Nine Inch Nails, which contains imagery involving terror, sexuality, and animal cruelty. In 1995, he directed the video for "Scream", set in space and performed by Michael and Janet Jackson, as well as the New Age surrealistic "Bedtime Story", performed by Madonna. They are two of the most expensive music videos ever made, costing $7 million and $5 million, respectively. "Scream" gained 11 nominations at the 1995 MTV Video Music Awards, including Romanek's second Best Direction nomination, and his first Grammy Award for Best Music Video, Short Form.

In 1996, Romanek directed the Mary Poppins-inspired "Novocaine for the Soul" for the rock band Eels. The following year, he directed Fiona Apple's "Criminal", which explores themes of voyeurism and adolescence; and won his second Grammy Award for Best Music Video, Short Form for "Got 'til It's Gone", performed by Janet Jackson, Q-Tip and Joni Mitchell. For his work in "Hurt" (2003), performed by Johnny Cash, Romanek earned another MTV nomination, and won his third Grammy. In 2004, he directed the auto-biographical music video for Jay-Z's "99 Problems", for which he won his first MTV award. Their subsequent collaborations—the installation-style 10-minute short film for "Picasso Baby" (2013), (Note: Also titled "Picasso Baby: A Performance Art Film".) and the animation video for "The Story of O.J." (2017)—were nominated for Grammy Award for Best Music Video.

Romanek made his feature-film directorial debut with the 1986 comedy-drama feature Static, which was nominated for Grand Jury Prize at the 1986 Sundance Film Festival. He received a Saturn Award for Best Writing nomination for his work in the psychological thriller One Hour Photo (2002), which starred Robin Williams. In 2010, he directed the romantic drama film Never Let Me Go, starring Carey Mulligan, Keira Knightley and Andrew Garfield, for which he was nominated for British Independent Film Award for Best Director. Romanek also directed several commercials for iPod, Nike, and ESPN.

== Music videos ==
Title	Year	Artist(s)	Notes	Ref.
"Sweet Bird of Truth"	1986	The The	Also editor	
"Madonna of the Wasps"	1989	Robyn Hitchcock and the Egyptians		
"One Long Pair of Eyes"	1989	Robyn Hitchcock and the Egyptians		
"Love Under New Management"	1989	Miki Howard		
"Until You Come Back to Me (That's What I'm Gonna Do)"	1990	Miki Howard		
"You Don't Have to Worry"	1990	En Vogue		
"Ring Ring Ring (Ha Ha Hey)"	1991	De La Soul		
"Love Conquers All"	1991	ABC		
"Wicked as It Seems"	1992	Keith Richards		
"Moira Jane's Café"	1992	Definition of Sound		
"What You Do to Me"	1992	Teenage Fanclub		
"Constant Craving"	1992	k.d. lang		
"Free Your Mind"	1992	En Vogue		
"Are You Gonna Go My Way"	1993	Lenny Kravitz		
"Rain"	1993	Madonna		
"Jump They Say"	1993	David Bowie		
"Black Tie White Noise"	1993	David Bowie		
"Is There Any Love in Your Heart"	1993	Lenny Kravitz		
"Beside You"	1994	Iggy Pop		
"Closer"	1994	Nine Inch Nails		
"Cold Beverage"	1994	G. Love & Special Sauce		
"Bedtime Story"	1995	Madonna		
"Strange Currencies"	1995	R.E.M.		
"Scream"	1995	Michael Jackson featuring Janet Jackson	Also writer	
"Little Trouble Girl"	1996	Sonic Youth		
"Novocaine for the Soul"	1996	Eels		
"El Scorcho"	1996	Weezer		
"Devils Haircut"	1996	Beck		
"The Perfect Drug"	1997	Nine Inch Nails		
"Criminal"	1997	Fiona Apple		
"Got 'til It's Gone"	1997	Janet Jackson featuring Q-Tip & Joni Mitchell		
"If You Can't Say No"	1998	Lenny Kravitz		
"Do Something"	1999	Macy Gray		
"I Try"	1999	Macy Gray		
"Sleepwalker"	2000	The Wallflowers		
"God Gave Me Everything"	2001	Mick Jagger		
"Hella Good"	2002	No Doubt		
"Cochise"	2002	Audioslave		
"Hurt"	2003	Johnny Cash		
"Can't Stop"	2003	Red Hot Chili Peppers		
"Faint"	2003	Linkin Park		
"99 Problems"	2004	Jay-Z		
"Speed of Sound"	2005	Coldplay		
"Picasso Baby"	2013	Jay-Z	Short film	
"Invisible"	2014	U2		
"Shake It Off"	2014	Taylor Swift		
"Sandcastles"	2016	Beyoncé	Additional director	
"Can't Stop the Feeling!"	2016	Justin Timberlake		
"The Story of O.J."	2017	Jay-Z	Co-directed with Jay-Z	
"Adnis"	2017	Jay-Z		
"Filthy"	2018	Justin Timberlake		
"Rescue Me"	2018	Thirty Seconds to Mars		

== Film ==
Title	Year	Credit	Notes	Ref.
Stony Island	1978	Second assistant cameraman		
Home Movies	1979	Second assistant director		
Static	1985	Director and co-writer	Feature directorial debut	
Inside Out IV	1992	Writer	Segment: "My Cyberian Rhapsody"	
One Hour Photo	2002	Director and writer		
Bee Season	2006	Executive producer		
Never Let Me Go	2010	Director		
The Vampire Attack	2010	Still photographer	Short film	
Object Permanence	2024	Director and writer	Short film	

Documentary appearances

- The Work of Director Mark Romanek (2005)
- Out of Print (2014)
- Robin Williams: Come Inside My Mind (2018)
- Be Natural: The Untold Story of Alice Guy-Blaché (2018)
- Arianne Phillips: Dressing the Part (2019)
- The Last Days of Edward Gorey (TBA)

== Television ==
Title	Year	Credit	Episode	Ref.
Locke & Key	2011	Director	Unaired television pilot	
The Whispers	2015	Co-director and executive producer	"X Marks the Spot"	
Vinyl	2016	Director	"Whispered Secrets"	
Tales from the Loop	2020	Director and executive producer	"Loop"	

== Commercials ==
Company / Brand	Year	Title	Ref.
Cirque du Soleil	1992	"Portraits"	
Nike	1997	"9000"	
CKOne	1998	"Danny"	
CKOne	1998	"Anna"	
Elizabeth Arden	2003	"ardenbeauty"	
Acura	2004	"Dance"	
American Express	2004	"Beautiful Things"	
ESPN	2004	"Makeshift"	
ESPN	2004	"Kissing"	
ESPN	2004	"Taking the Field"	
iPod	2004	"Vertigo"	
Nike	2004	"Tell Me"	
Saturn	2004	"Door Music"	
ESPN	2005	"Nothing to Say"	
ESPN	2005	"Without Sports"	
Grey Goose	2005	"VIP" (Note: Split into four 15-second ads, tagged as "The world’s best tasting vodka".)	
iPod	2005	"Detroit"	
UPS	2005	"Oracle"	
UPS	2005	"You/They"	
Acura	2006	"TechnoTraction"	
Acura	2006	"TurboTravel"	
Acura	2006	"TechnoWorship"	
iPod	2006	"iPod Shuffle"	
iPod	2006	"The Audience Is Listening"	
iPod	2006	"Quartet"	
iPod	2006	"Love Train"	
Nikon	2006	"Kate"	
Cadillac	2006	"Sun"	
Motorola	2006	"Rick Rubin"	
Motorola	2006	"Chester Bennington"	
Motorola	2006	"Kanye West"	
iPod	2007	"Island"	
iPod	2007	"Mary J. Blige"	
Honda	2007	"Hondamentalism"	
iPod	2008	"Gamma"	
iPod	2008	"Gamma (Online case)"	
Jeep	2008	"Grand Ol' Opera"	
Nike	2008	"Simple Math"	
Nike	2008	"Take Over"	
iTunes	2008	"Coldplay Sonic"	
Nike	2009	"The Chalk"	
iPod	2010	"New Way To Nano"	
Dodge	2010	"Man's Last Stand"	
Heineken	2010	"Boss' Daughter"	
Delta Air Lines	2010	"Keep Climbing"	
Delta Air Lines	2010	"Human Factor"	
H&R Block	2010	"Never Settle for Less"	
Kia	2010	"Michelle Wie"	
iPhone	2011	"Snow Today"	
iPod	2011	"Share the Fun"	
Kia	2011	"Share Some Soul"	
H&R Block	2011	"Greenback"	
H&R Block	2011	"Nickel Dinner"	
H&R Block	2011	"Quit Lady"	
Chevrolet	2011	"Like Father, Like Son"	
Hyundai	2011	"Sonata Turbo Face"	
iPhone	2011	"Assistant"	
Nike	2012	"Fast is Faster"	
Nike	2012	"Voices"	
Motorola	2012	"Projections"	
iPhone	2012	"Rock God"	
iPhone	2012	"Road Trip"	
Samsung	2012	"LeBron's Day"	
Samsung & Jay-Z	2013	"Inside Magna Carta Holy Grail"	
Gillette	2013	"Clay Matthews Conditions"	
NASCAR	2013	"Twist"	
Call of Duty	2013	"Ghosts Masked Warrior"	
Budweiser	2013	"Rihanna"	
Budweiser	2013	"Jay Z"	
Sonos	2014	"Faces Off"	
Miller	2014	"Central Park"	
Apple Music	2014	"Echoes"	
Yoplait	2015	"A Man of Yogurt – Hunger"	
Yoplait	2015	"A Man of Yogurt – Texture"	
Yoplait	2015	"A Man of Yogurt – Satiety"	
Nike	2016	"The Conductor"	
Nike	2016	"Come Out of Nowhere"	
Nike	2016	"Make Space"	
Bud Light	2016	"Your Can's Year"	
Budweiser	2017	"Dream. On."	
Tiffany & Co.	2018	"Believe in Dreams"	
H&M	2021	"ONE/SECOND/SUIT"	
Apple Music	2021	"Happier Than Ever"	
Tiffany & Co.	2022	"Lose Yourself in Love"	
Fox Sports & NFL	2024	"Back to Work"	
Chipotle	2024	"I Got Real"	
