= The Chocolate War (film) =

1988 film by Keith Gordon

- Theatrical release poster
- Directed by: Keith Gordon
- Written by: Keith Gordon
- Based on: The Chocolate War by Robert Cormier
- Produced by: Jonathan D. Krane
- Starring: John Glover; Ilan Mitchell-Smith; Wally Ward; Doug Hutchison; Jenny Wright; Bud Cort
- Cinematography: Tom Richmond
- Edited by: Jeff Wishengrad
- Distributed by: MCEG Sterling
- Release date: November 18, 1988
- Running time: 100 minutes
- Country: United States
- Language: English
- Budget: $500,000
- Box office: $303,624

The Chocolate War is a 1988 American drama film written and directed by Keith Gordon. It is based on Robert Cormier's novel of the same name, about a young man who rebels against the ingrained hierarchy of an elite Catholic school. It was Gordon's directorial debut, and stars John Glover, Ilan Mitchell-Smith, Wallace Langham (credited as Wally Ward), and Doug Hutchison. Jonathan D. Krane produced it after seeing Static, a film Gordon wrote.

== Plot ==
The film offers a portrait of the hierarchical structure, both formal and informal, of a Catholic boys' boarding school. New student Jerry Renault (Ilan Mitchell-Smith) must submit to the bizarre rituals of his peers and the expectations of the school's administration by selling chocolates as a fundraiser. A secret society of students, The Vigils, assigns Jerry the task of refusing to sell chocolates for ten days, an act which draws the ire of the school's clever but cruel and manipulative acting headmaster, Brother Leon (John Glover). However, Jerry continues refusing to participate in the chocolate sale well after the ten days are up, and it becomes apparent that he is acting on his own. When he is pressed for a reason as to why he is refusing to sell the chocolates, Jerry never gives an answer, and seems not to even have one.

The Vigils are drawn into an alliance with Brother Leon to ensure the sale succeeds, as both now have their reputations on the line. Leon needs the sale to succeed so no one will know he overstepped his authority in spending $20,000 of school money on the chocolates, and The Vigils cannot have anyone getting the idea that someone can defy them and get away with it–which is exactly what the students see happening. The Machiavellian and creative Archie Costello, Assigner of The Vigils, summons Jerry to a face-to-face meeting before the secret society and orders him to sell the chocolates. When Jerry still doesn't, Archie orders The Vigils to step up the hazing and bullying to pressure Jerry into giving in. At the same time, he organizes a Vigils-backed publicity campaign at Trinity, under a simple yet brilliant slogan that he presents to the other Vigils: "We'll make selling chocolates popular." Public opinion at Trinity begins to turn against Jerry. He goes from being seen as a rebel hero to the only one not possessing enough school spirit. Roland Goubert, popularly known as "The Goober", quietly joins Jerry in refusing to sell the chocolates, but the 50 boxes he was to sell are sold by other boys and then credited to his name, helping keep up the illusion that every single boy but Jerry is eagerly participating in the sale.

Hounded everywhere he goes, Jerry is cornered on the way home from school by Emile Janza, a strong and brutish boy brought into the harassment campaign by Archie. After being taunted into anger by Emile, Jerry is ambushed by a group of local children and beaten up. Archie calls him soon after, and convinces Jerry that the ambush was all Emile's idea and that Jerry will have a chance to get his revenge if he wants it. Jerry, Emile, Archie, and almost the whole student body of Trinity come out to the school grounds at night, for a boxing match between Emile and Jerry. Each blow will be decided by a boy who has bought a ticket and has written on the ticket who is to throw the punch and in what way. Vigils President John Carter and Secretary Obie Jameson, envious of Archie, have conspired against him and invoke an old tradition among The Vigils: whenever the Assigner orders a student to perform an Assignment, he must draw a marble from a black box. Inside are several white marbles and one black one. After drawing a white marble for Jerry's place, Archie draws the black marble for the first time in his career in The Vigils, meaning he must take Emile Janza's place in the match.

Resigned to the “assignment,” Jerry fights in accordance with the rules. He takes a few prescribed punches from Archie, then is given one of his own to deliver. Angered, Archie breaks from the plan and kicks Jerry in the groin. Jerry goes on the attack and beats Archie, who is unable to defend himself. Jerry knocks Archie out and is elated, facing the cheering crowd (including approving looks and cheers from Carter and Obie). He deflates when he sees Goober’s disappointed, hurt face, then imagines seeing the disapproving look of his dead mother in the midst of the cheering crowd. Jerry realizes that even though he has won, he has played into the machinations of Leon and The Vigils anyway. His attempted act of rebellion has actually helped Brother Leon and The Vigils get the chocolates sold and remain in control of Trinity. The final scene shows Obie Jameson, the new Assigner of The Vigils, gleefully giving orders to a subdued and humiliated Archie, who has been demoted to Secretary. Obie, possessing none of Archie's creativity, devises crude, simplistic assignments.

== Cast ==
- John Glover as Brother Leon
- Ilan Mitchell-Smith as Jerry Renault
- Doug Hutchison as Obie Jameson
- Wallace Langham as Archie Costello
- Corey Gunnestad as Roland "Goober" Goubert
- Brent Fraser as Emile Janza
- Robert Davenport as Brian Cochran
- Jenny Wright as Lisa
- Bud Cort as Brother Jacques
- Adam Baldwin as John Carter
- Ethan Sandler as David Caroni

== Reception ==
On a $500,000 budget, The Chocolate War grossed a mere $303,624, and is considered a box office flop.

The film received mostly positive reviews from critics, and held a score of 77% on Rotten Tomatoes, based on 13 reviews.

Sheila Benson, writing for The Los Angeles Times, praised the movie, calling it "a first-rate adaptation" of Robert Cormier’s "dark, cautionary tale about personal freedom" and a "haunting allegory" that "may be best remembered as the directing debut of Keith Gordon."

Janet Maslin was critical, giving it a mixed review the movie for The New York Times, calling it "a film about schoolboys that has its own unmistakably schoolboy point of view."

== Home media ==
After various VHS releases went out of print, the film was released on DVD in 2007 by MGM Home Entertainment (the owners of the MCEG/Virgin library) and 20th Century Fox Home Entertainment. The special features consist of:

- Audio commentary by director Keith Gordon
- Interview with director Keith Gordon
