= Dead Man's Party =

Dead Man's Party may refer to:

- Dead Man's Party (album), by Oingo Boingo, 1985
  - "Dead Man's Party" (song), the title song, released as a single in 1986
- "Dead Man's Party" (Buffy the Vampire Slayer), a 1998 TV episode
- "Dead Man's Party" (Shadowhunters), a 2016 TV episode
- "Dead Man's Party" (Spider-Man), a 2018 TV episode
