= Cold Case (disambiguation) =

A cold case is an unsolved crime no longer being investigated.

Cold Case (drama, 2003–2010) and Cold Case Files (documentary, 1999–2017) were American TV series.

Cold Case may also refer to:

- "Cold Case" (Sue Thomas: F.B.Eye), television episode
- "Cold Case" ('Til Death), television episode
- "Cold Case" (The Whole Truth), television episode
- A Cold Case, a novel by Philip Gourevitch
- Cold Case (film), a 2021 Malayalam language film
