= Taxxi =

English rock band

- Origin: London, England
- Genres: Rock, pop rock, new wave
- Years active: 1979–1987
- Labels: Fantasy Records, MCA Records (U.S.); Carrere (France), Hispavox (Spain)
- Past members: David Cumming; Colin Payne; Jeffrey Nead

Taxxi were an English rock band best known for the song "I'm Leaving". The band formed in the late 1970s and first came to prominence in the early 1980s with a few minor AOR hit singles and some MTV airplay.

The band received club play in France with the album tracks "Not Me Girl", "Girl (New York City)" and "Metro Boulot Dodo". Their most successful U.S. album was States of Emergency, which featured three tracks that received rock radio airplay: the aforementioned "I'm Leaving", "Cocktail Queen (Don't She Love To Rock & Roll)" and "The Heart Is A Lonely Hunter". "Still in Love" was remixed for a 12" single which received minor club airplay in the U.S.

== History ==
Scottish-born singer and guitarist David Cumming, keyboardist Colin Payne, and drummer Jeffrey Nead formed the band in London in the late-1970s. Through an association with Kit Lambert the band recorded demos and were eventually signed by Berkeley's Fantasy Records. Teamed with producer Phil Kaffel the band recorded three albums for Fantasy Records. Filling out the trio's sound were session musicians including bassist Randy Jackson, keyboardist Tim Gorman, guitarists Danny Chauncey and Marlon McClain, and saxophonist Steve Douglas. Journey drummer Steve Smith lent a hand on tambourine for their second album. Touring members of the band also included Los Angeles-based musicians Glenn Rueger (keyboards) and David Resnik (guitar).Moving to MCA Records in 1985, Taxxi recorded their fourth album with Tom Dowd. A fifth album that included Kevin Russell from the band 707 was recorded but never released.

In 2001, Chequered Past, a compilation CD was remastered with participation by the band and their original producer. Although released by Fantasy Records, it ignored the band's fourth album and their unreleased material.

The last release, Traxx, was a new album of unreleased "lost" tracks from 1987 to 1988 recording sessions. At the request of MelodicRock Records, Melodicrock.com's Andrew McNeice, the band went back into their archives and pulled out 11 songs from 1987 to 1988, which were remastered by the legendary JK Northrup (Billy Thorpe, Paul Shortino, Northrup, King Kobra).

The band opened in concert for the Police, Triumph, Foreigner, Night Ranger, Loverboy, Blue Öyster Cult, Joan Jett and the Motels; they released five music videos.

== Discography ==
- Day For Night (1980)
- States of Emergency (1982) – including "I'm Leaving", #39 Billboard Mainstream Rock Tracks chart
- Foreign Tongue (1983) – including "Maybe Someday", #31 Mainstream Rock Tracks chart
- Exposé (1985) – including "Still in Love", #36 Mainstream Rock Tracks chart
- Chequered Past (2001) – remastered CD collection of 15 tracks from their first three albums for Fantasy Records
- Traxx (2014) – eleven previously unreleased songs were released on 4 November 2014

== Soundtracks and compilations ==
- Weird Science (1985) – including "Forever"
- The Secret of My Succe$s (1987) – including "Heaven and the Heartaches"
