= The Ballad of Abu Ghraib =

2008 Non-fiction Book by Philip Gourevitch

- First edition
- Author: Philip Gourevitch and Errol Morris
- Original title: Standard Operating Procedure
- Language: English
- Genre: Nonfiction
- Published: 2008 Penguin
- Publication place: United States
- Media type: Print (hardback & paperback)
- Pages: 304 pp
- ISBN: 0-14-311539-1

The Ballad of Abu Ghraib, also known as Standard Operating Procedure in its original hardback release, is a 2008 nonfiction book by American writer Philip Gourevitch and Errol Morris. The book focuses on Abu Ghraib prison and was inspired by the photographs of the prison that were released following the American occupation of Iraq.

== Summary ==
The book is an account of Iraq's Abu Ghraib prison under the American occupation. The text is based on more than 200 hours of interviews with soldiers at Abu Ghraib, Gourevitch using the interviews as a basis to discuss and analyze both the guards and the prisoners of the prison.

Despite the proliferation of photographs of Abu Ghraib prison, the writers chose to use no pictures in the book. According to Gourevitch, “Photographs cannot tell stories. They can only provide evidence of stories, and evidence is mute; it demands investigation and interpretation . . . an invitation to look more closely.”

== Film ==
While writing the book with Gourevitch, Morris also directed a documentary film on the same subject and with the same name. The film was released alongside the book.
