= Mark Romanek =

American director (born 1959)

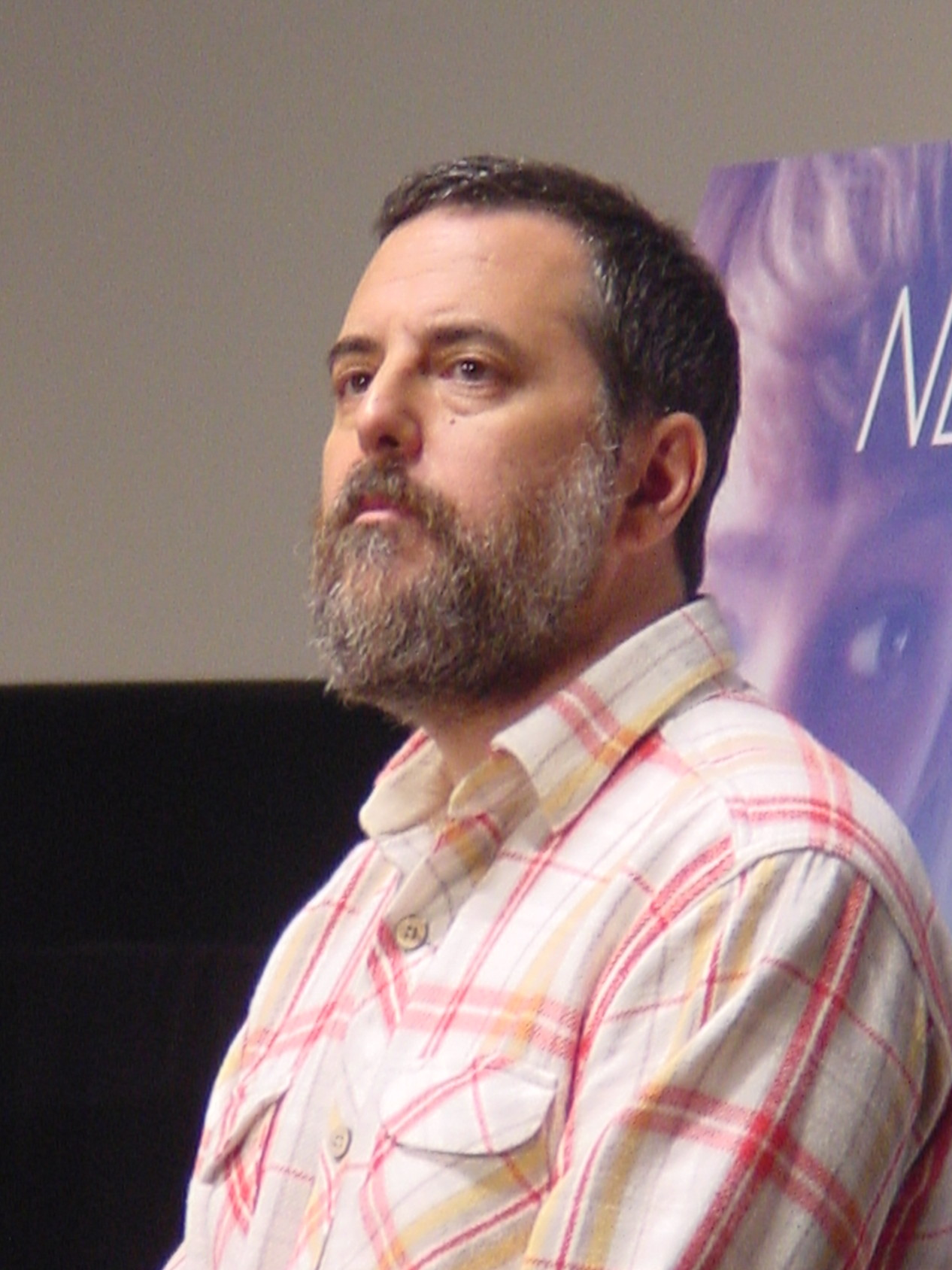
- Romanek in 2010
- Born: September 18, 1959 (age 67); Chicago, Illinois, U.S.
- Education: Ithaca College (BS)
- Occupations: Filmmaker, photographer
- Years active: 1985–present
- Spouse: Brigette McWilliams (m. 2005; div. 2022)
- Children: 2

Mark Lee Romanek (/roʊˈmænɪk/; born September 18, 1959) is an American film, music video and commercial director and photographer. He is best known for directing the films One Hour Photo (2002) and Never Let Me Go (2010). Romanek's music videos have come to be regarded as among the best of the medium. They have earned him three Grammy Awards for Best Short Form Music Video and 20 MTV Video Music Awards, including Best Direction for Jay-Z's "99 Problems" and the Michael Jackson Video Vanguard Award.

He directed the video for Johnny Cash's song "Hurt," a cover of the Nine Inch Nails song, which was ranked the greatest music video of all time by NME in 2011 and the second greatest of all time by Rolling Stone in 2021.

Romanek has also directed episodes for television series such as The Whispers (2015), Vinyl (2016), and Tales from the Loop (2020).

== Early life ==
Mark Lee Romanek was born in Chicago on September 18, 1959, the son of Jewish parents Shirlee and Marvin Romanek. He was inspired to become a filmmaker by seeing Stanley Kubrick's film 2001: A Space Odyssey (1968) as a child. He experimented with Super 8 mm and 16 mm film as a teenager. He attended New Trier High School, where he studied under Kevin Dole, who was already creating music videos on his own in the mid-1970s, and Peter Kingsbury.

Romanek subsequently attended Ithaca College in Ithaca, New York, and graduated from its Roy H. Park School of Communications with a degree in cinema and photography. He served as second assistant director on Brian De Palma's film Home Movies (1979), an autobiographical work conceived as an exercise for De Palma's students at Sarah Lawrence College, where he was once a student himself. Romanek met actor Keith Gordon, who played De Palma's alter ego, on the set of the film; Gordon later remembered Romanek's entrance into film production:

I actually met a lot of people who became important in my life, but Mark [was] one of the people who was really huge. Mark wasn't even officially one of the students in the class. Mark was kind of like me—he was a film geek. He was from Chicago. And he had followed Brian around on the set of The Fury and gotten a job as a production assistant on that movie. And when he heard that Brian was doing this project, he basically contacted him and said, "Listen, can I come to New York and basically be like one of the students, even though I'm not technically in the class?" And Brian said, "Fine." So Mark became the second assistant director on the film. And he and I just hit it off pretty quickly. We had a similar passion for Stanley Kubrick. He showed me his short films, which I thought were really good and showed a lot of visual flair.

== Career ==
=== Music videos ===
After a few years writing screenplays, Romanek focused on music videos and signed on with Satellite Films, a division of Propaganda Films. One of his notable videos was for the Nine Inch Nails song "Closer". Its critical acclaim was only matched by its controversy, with many accusing the video as being disturbing and demonic. Romanek worked again with Nine Inch Nails for the song "The Perfect Drug".

Romanek directed the music videos for David Bowie's 1993 singles "Jump They Say" and "Black Tie White Noise".

Romanek was given his first Grammy Award for Best Short Form Music Video in 1996 for "Scream", a collaboration between the pop superstar siblings Michael Jackson and Janet Jackson. The video, which cost $7 million to make, is cited as one of the most expensive ever made. Romanek won his second Grammy two years later, again with Janet Jackson, for her video "Got 'til It's Gone". In 2002, Romanek shot a video for Audioslave's "Cochise" in which the band performed in the midst of a prolonged pyrotechnic display of the intensity usually seen only during a fireworks finale. The explosions were so loud during the night shoot in the San Fernando Valley that local police received over five hundreds of calls from residents because of the noise.

Romanek's 2002 music video for Johnny Cash's cover of Nine Inch Nails' "Hurt" was nominated for seven VMAs, winning one for cinematography, and also won Romanek his third Grammy. The song expresses self loathing and the futility of worldly accomplishments; this content took on a new poignancy when sung by Cash near the end of his life, quietly performing in his memorabilia-filled home, with shots of the flood ravens "House of Cash" museum and archival shots of a younger Cash edited in.

Other Romanek videos that have received accolades and awards include the VMA winners "Free Your Mind" (En Vogue), "Are You Gonna Go My Way" (Lenny Kravitz), "Rain" (Madonna), "Devil's Haircut" (Beck), "99 Problems" (Jay-Z), and "Criminal" (Fiona Apple). In 1997, Romanek received the VMA Michael Jackson Video Vanguard Award for his contribution to the medium. Two of his music videos, "Closer" by Nine Inch Nails and "Bedtime Story" by Madonna, have been made part of the permanent collection of the Museum of Modern Art in New York City.

In a 2013 interview with IndieWire, Romanek responded to the question of whether he would direct another music video:

I'm kind of over it. I think I made about 100 music videos or more and that was a young man's challenge. I'm still a rabid music fan and I have ideas for music videos once in a while, but it's just not my focus. I have two children and a wife and a mortgage, if you want to be a filmmaker you need to be paying for your life some way. I can't make a film every five years and send my kids to a nice school.

Despite this, Romanek returned to music video directing with Jay-Z's performance art piece "Picasso Baby", which aired on HBO on August 2, 2013. The video was shot inside the Pace Gallery in New York and featured a group of personalities from the world of art, including Marina Abramović, whose 2010 performance art work "The Artist is Present" inspired the video. This marked Romanek's first music video in eight years, his last being Coldplay's video for "Speed of Sound" in 2005.

Romanek then directed "Filthy" by Justin Timberlake and "Rescue Me" by Thirty Seconds to Mars, which both premiered in 2018.

In 2022, Romanek directed a 180-degree virtual reality concert for Foo Fighters, featuring a song by the group never before played.

=== Film and TV ===
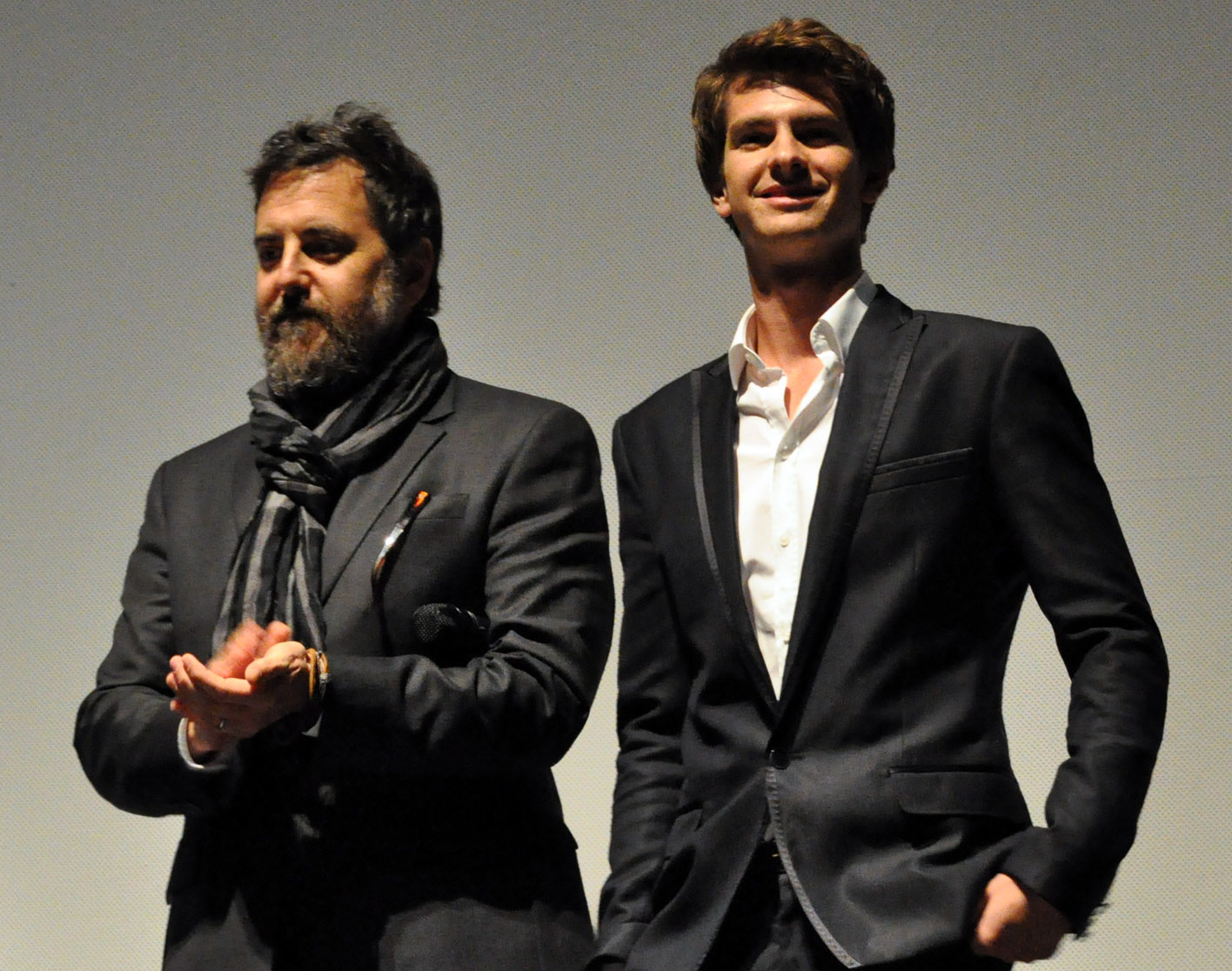
Romanek and star Andrew Garfield at a screening of Never Let Me Go at the 2010 Toronto International Film Festival

Romanek's first film, Static (1985), followed a man claiming to have invented a television set capable of showing a live picture of Heaven. The film led to his first music video job, but he later disowned it and called it an "embarrassing bit of juvenilia".

In 2002, Romanek wrote and directed his second feature film, One Hour Photo, starring Robin Williams as a department store photo processor who becomes obsessed with a local family through the photographs they bring to him to be developed. The film was only a moderate hit, but still established Romanek as a director. Rumors spread that the studio, Fox Searchlight, had forced changes on Romanek that seriously altered the film from how he had intended it. He has dismissed this story, however, stating that there never was a director's cut and that the studio did not exercise any editorial control.

Romanek had hoped to follow the film with an adaptation of Philip Gourevitch's A Cold Case which was to star Tom Hanks as chief investigator Andy Rosenzweig. The film went into development hell due to scheduling conflicts and issues with rights. In 2013, Romanek said he still hoped to make the film someday: "The character in the film is a bit older and I think someday, in the next eight years or something, maybe it'll be the right time to do [it]."

In 2008, after Romanek left as the director of The Wolfman due to creative differences, he accepted the offer to work on Never Let Me Go. Romanek was glad to get the opportunity to shoot the film, saying "From the moment I finished the novel, it became my dream to film it. [Kazuo] Ishiguro's conception is so daring, so eerie and beautiful. Alex Garland's adaptation is sensitive and precise. The cast is perfect, the crew superb." The film was released in 2010 to mostly positive reviews and was the 28th highest-grossing film at the box office for that week.

Throughout the 2010s, Romanek circled numerous projects that never materialized under his direction, including a remake of The Boston Strangler, the Shining prequel The Overlook Hotel, the David Mamet-penned conspiracy thriller Blackbird, and a film about the Norco shootout, amongst others. "I wish I had made ten films by now," Romanek said in 2020. "It's not for lack of trying... I have a lot of movies that I worked on that didn't come together." Romanek has however directed several episodes for television, including the HBO series Vinyl and the Amazon Prime series Tales from the Loop, which he also executive produced.

In 2021, it was reported that Romanek would direct the horror film Mother Land which would have been his first feature film in over a decade. However, in May 2022, it was reported that Alexandre Aja would be directing the film. It was released as Never Let Go in 2024.

In addition to continuing work in advertising, in the 2020s, Romanek began experimenting with AI, using it as a creative outlet to bounce around concepts or ideas he was pondering. As of 2025, Romanek was said to be in the midst of planning a film directly conceived as a result of his many unproduced projects; with the story itself tackling the subject of "unfinished art". He was inspired to write it upon attending an exhibition that showcased unfinished pieces of artwork.

=== Photography ===
Romanek has also been recognized for his photography skills, having taken pictures of various celebrities he befriended throughout his career. They include Kanye West, Paul McCartney, Lenny Kravitz, Iggy Pop, Mick Jagger, Robin Williams, Harmony Korine, Wes Anderson, Sofia Coppola, Francis Ford Coppola, and Jay-Z. Romanek has said that while the photographs are all of famous people, he still considers them personal.

In 2017, thirty of Romanek's photographs were exhibited at the French retailer Colette for the series entitled SNAPSHOTS.

== Personal life ==
Romanek resides in Los Angeles. He married singer Brigette McWilliams in 2005, and they had two daughters together before divorcing in 2022.

== Influences ==
In 2012, Romanek participated in the Sight & Sound film polls. Held every ten years to select the greatest films of all time, contemporary directors were asked to select ten films of their choice. Romanek gave the following ten, in alphabetical order:

- 8½ (Italy, 1963)
- Andrei Rublev (Soviet Union, 1966)
- Apocalypse Now (USA, 1979)
- Barry Lyndon (UK/USA, 1975)
- Citizen Kane (USA, 1941)
- Days of Heaven (USA, 1978)
- Fanny and Alexander (Sweden/France, 1982)
- The Godfather Part II (USA, 1974)
- Heaven's Gate (USA, 1980)
- Lawrence of Arabia (UK/USA, 1962)

== Filmography ==
=== Film ===
Year	Title	Director	Writer
1985	Static	Yes	Yes
2002	One Hour Photo	Yes	Yes
2010	Never Let Me Go	Yes	No

=== Television ===
Year	Title	Director	Executive producer	Notes
2011	Locke & Key	Yes	No	Unaired pilot
2015	The Whispers	Yes	Yes	Episode: "X Marks the Spot"
2016	Vinyl	Yes	No	Episode: "Whispered Secrets"
2020	Tales from the Loop	Yes	Yes	Episode: "Loop"

=== Unrealized projects ===
Year	Title and description	Ref.
1990s	Arbus, a biopic adapted by Romanek from Patricia Bosworth's biography about photographer Diane Arbus	
1990s	Paradise Falls, an "afterlife thriller" written by Darren Lemke	
1990s	Untitled Jason Keller and Brent Roam screenplay	
1990s	Urban Townies, a drama written by Jesse Wigutow starring Brad Pitt	
2000s	Untitled psychological war film	
2000s	Untitled film about "a man who's defined by his job"	
2000s	A film adaptation of Philip Gourevitch's novel A Cold Case written by John Sayles and Eric Roth starring Tom Hanks	
2000s	The Omen	
2000s	The Strangers	
2000s	A film adaptation of James Frey's novel A Million Little Pieces	
2000s	A Parking Ticket, retitled from In Deep, a black comedy written by Steven Conrad starring Ben Stiller	
2000s	The Wolfman	
2010s	The Voices starring Ben Stiller as Jerry Hickfang	
2010s	The Wolverine	
2010s	Oldboy	
2010s	Cinderella	
2010s	A film adaptation of Dan Brown's novel The Lost Symbol starring Tom Hanks as Robert Langdon	
2010s	Untitled FX true crime limited series	
2010s	Boston Strangler, a remake of the 1968 film written by Chuck MacLean starring Casey Affleck	
2010s	The Overlook Hotel, a prequel to The Shining written by Glen Mazzara set at the turn of the 20th century	
2010s	Blackbird, a conspiracy thriller written by David Mamet starring Cate Blanchett	
2010s	Norco, a heist film written by Adair Cole inspired by the true story of the 1980 Norco bank robbery	
2010s	Septillion to One, a romantic comedy written by Adam R. Perlman and Graham Sack	
2020s	Untitled Kyle Fried collaboration	
2020s	Never Let Go, retitled from Mother Land	
2020s	Untitled Gulf War screenplay	
