= Yesterday Once More (Vinyl) =

- Vinyl episode
- Episode no.: Episode 2
- Directed by: Allen Coulter
- Written by: Terence Winter
- Cinematography by: Reed Morano
- Editing by: Tim Streeto
- Original release date: February 21, 2016
- Running time: 56 minutes

Guest appearances
- John Cameron Mitchell as Andy Warhol; Susan Heyward as Cece; Emily Tremaine as Heather; Ephraim Sykes as Marvin; MacKenzie Meehan as Penny; Griffin Newman as Casper; Jay Klaitz as Hal Underwood

Episode chronology
← Previous "Pilot"	Next → "Whispered Secrets"

"Yesterday Once More" is the second episode of the American period drama television series Vinyl. The episode was written by series creator Terence Winter, and directed by executive producer Allen Coulter. It originally aired on HBO on February 21, 2016.

The series is set in New York City in the 1970s. It focuses on Richie Finestra, American Century Records founder and president, whose passion for music and discovering talent has gone by the wayside. With his American Century Records on the verge of being sold, a life-altering event rekindles Finestra's professional fire, but it may leave his personal life in ruins. In the episode, Richie makes a controversial move at American Century, while Devon remembers the past.

According to Nielsen Media Research, the episode was seen by an estimated 0.667 million household viewers and gained a 0.2 ratings share among adults aged 18–49. The episode received generally positive reviews from critics, with praise towards the character development, although the subplots received criticism.

== Plot ==
At a theater, a heavily intoxicated Richie (Bobby Cannavale) annoys the audience during a screening of Enter the Dragon. He then returns to the American Century offices, where he shocks his associates by announcing that he won't sell the company to PolyGram. The Germans angrily leave and Richie faces the ire of Zak (Ray Romano), Skip (J. C. MacKenzie) and company attorney Scott Levitt (P. J. Byrne).

Devon (Olivia Wilde) is angered with Richie's behavior, and she decides to take the kids for breakfast at a restaurant. However, she gets distracted by a memory, in which she met Richie while she was a muse to Andy Warhol (John Cameron Mitchell) at his Factory. This makes her forget her kids at the restaurant. She visits Richie in New York to scold him for his actions, when they are visited by Detective Eddie Voehel (Greg Vrotsos). Voehel is not investigating Richie for Buck's murder, but he actually wants his help in tracking Maury Gold (Paul Ben-Victor), a record executive who possibly hired Corrado to murder people. After he leaves, Richie promises Devon that he will change.

Richie pushes the staff into finding new talent, threatening with firing them within two weeks if they don't get anything. Jamie (Juno Temple) convinces him in giving a chance Nasty Bits, as she brought the band's attention to him. Richie sends head of A&R Julian "Julie" Silver (Max Casella) to check a performance, but is unimpressed with the band. Still seeing potential, he decides to make the band change their sound.

Devon attempts to seduce Richie, but he is not interested in sex. Another memory depicts Richie and Devon thinking about their plans when she got pregnant with their first child. That night, Richie decides to visit Lester Grimes (Ato Essandoh) at his house.

== Production ==
=== Development ===
In February 2016, HBO announced that the second episode of the series would be titled "Yesterday Once More", and that it would be written by series creator Terence Winter, and directed by executive producer Allen Coulter. This was Winter's second writing credit, and Coulter's first directing credit.

== Reception ==
=== Viewers ===
In its original American broadcast, "Yesterday Once More" was seen by an estimated 0.667 million household viewers with a 0.27 in the 18–49 demographics. This means that 0.27 percent of all households with televisions watched the episode. This was a 13% decrease in viewership from the previous episode, which was watched by 0.764 million household viewers with a 0.25 in the 18-49 demographics.

=== Critical reviews ===
"Yesterday Once More" received generally positive reviews from critics. Matt Fowler of IGN gave the episode a "good" 7.5 out of 10 and wrote in his verdict, "'Yesterday Once More' assumedly kicked off what's to be the main crux of the series - Richie's play to reinvent his own label and find the newest, hottest thing in music. So far, it's just him and his ego driving the series, though there were some moments this week that suggested that - eventually - the mob will come into play. I'm not sure if that'll make things more interesting or not, but at least it might act as a foil for our lead's boisterous and bullying ways."

Dan Caffrey of The A.V. Club gave the episode a "B+" grade and wrote, "Is Vinyl positioning Richie to be right about everything? Is he being set up as a coked-out music revolutionary or a tragic antihero? Although many of you would probably say the latter, if we're speaking in Scorsesian terms, I'm not so sure. We've seen many drug-fueled rise-and-fall tales from him before, but we've also seen the other side with The Wolf of Wall Street. And for anyone who argues that film as being another example of a rise-and-fall story, I view it more as a getting-away-with-it story."

Leah Greenblatt of Entertainment Weekly wrote, "Do you smell a rat? Because that's the first, furry face we see on screen this week, and even a garbage-eating rodent probably thinks Richie Finestra is kind of losing it." Noel Murray of Vulture gave the episode a 3 star rating out of 5 and wrote, "It doesn't appear that Vinyl intends to ignore the damage that a spoiled idealist like Richie Finestra can cause, either directly or indirectly. This is what it really means to be a big shot. Richie makes the plans and everyone else makes the commitments."

Gavin Edwards of The New York Times wrote, "Richie is firmly in the recent tradition of the cable TV 'difficult man' who charms the viewer not just in spite of his bad behavior, but because of it. [...] More interesting than Richie's domestic life has been how his rebirth as a raging bull affects his staff at American Century." Dan Martin of The Guardian wrote, "Richie's crisis is in full swing and Devon recalls her 60s heyday at Andy Warhol's Factory. It's seductive stuff – but is it all too strange and self-indulgent?"

Tony Sokol of Den of Geek gave the episode a 4 star rating out of 5 and wrote, "'Yesterday Once More' moves Vinyl into the series proper from the cinematic opening episode. The characters are getting more familiar and the camera continues to get intimate. The excitement is building and so are the stakes. Something big is going to break and the air is filled with promise and danger." Robert Ham of Paste wrote, "If you're Richie Finestra, you apparently snort some more blow and make a fool out of yourself in a shady theater, acting along with a Bruce Lee movie like it’s a midnight screening of Rocky Horror. I'm slowly accepting the fact that this show is completely removed from reality, but that sure doesn't make a dumb scene like that one any easier to swallow."
