= Keith Gordon =

American actor and director

- Born: February 3, 1961 (age 65); New York City, U.S.
- Occupations: Actor, film director
- Years active: 1975–present
- Spouse: Rachel Griffin (m. 1998)
- Father: Mark Gordon

Keith Gordon (born February 3, 1961) is an American actor and film director.

As an actor, he is best known for his debut role in Jaws 2, and the starring role in John Carpenter's Christine and Back to School. As a director in film and television, his most high-profile works include the films The Chocolate War, A Midnight Clear, Waking the Dead, and The Singing Detective, as well as episodes of Dexter, Homeland, The Leftovers, Fargo and Better Call Saul.

== Early life ==
Gordon was born in New York City, the son of Mark, an actor and stage director, and Barbara Gordon. He grew up in an atheist Jewish family. Gordon was inspired to become an actor at the age of twelve, after seeing James Earl Jones in a Broadway production of Of Mice and Men.

== Career ==
Gordon's first feature film role was the class clown Doug in Jaws 2 (the 1978 sequel to the blockbuster hit Jaws). In 1979 Gordon appeared in Bob Fosse's semi-autobiographical All That Jazz as the teenage version of the film's protagonist Joe Gideon (played by Gordon's Jaws 2 co-star Roy Scheider). Gordon then appeared in two films by Brian De Palma: as a film student in Home Movies (1979) and in the 1980 erotic thriller Dressed to Kill as the son of Angie Dickinson's character. Gordon played Arnie Cunningham, the main character (who buys the titular car Christine), in the 1983 horror film Christine, directed by John Carpenter from the novel by Stephen King. In the 1985 film The Legend of Billie Jean Gordon played Lloyd Muldaur, the son of a District Attorney who aspires to be Attorney General. He was in the 1986 Mark Romanek film Static, and he wrote the screenplay. In the 1986 comedy movie Back to School, Gordon played Jason Melon, the son of Rodney Dangerfield's character. In most of these films, he played a nerd. He was named number 1 in Cinematicals' Top 7 Most Convincing Nerds. His most recent onscreen film appearance was in 2001, in the movie Delivering Milo.

Gordon left acting for directing, making his debut in 1988 with the movie The Chocolate War, about a student who rebels against the rigid hierarchies in his Catholic school. Although it was a box-office bomb, it remains his most critically-acclaimed film, earning an Independent Spirit Award nomination for Best First Feature. His other films include the 1992 anti-war film A Midnight Clear, about a group of American soldiers in the Ardennes just before and during the Battle of the Bulge, as well as Mother Night (adapted from the novel by Kurt Vonnegut), Waking the Dead, and the film The Singing Detective. For his work on A Midnight Clear, Gordon received an Independent Spirit Award nomination for Best Screenplay. He also directed some of the mini-series Wild Palms and appeared in the 2006 Iraq War documentary Whose War?. His directing credits for television include Homicide: Life on the Street, Gideon's Crossing, Dexter, The Bridge, House, Better Call Saul, and the second and third seasons of Fargo.

== Filmography ==
=== Film ===
| Year | Title | Director | Producer | Writer |
|---|---|---|---|---|
| 1985 | Static | No | Yes | Yes |
| 1988 | The Chocolate War | Yes | No | Yes |
| 1992 | A Midnight Clear | Yes | No | Yes |
| 1996 | Mother Night | Yes | Yes | No |
| 2000 | Waking the Dead | Yes | Yes | No |
| 2003 | The Singing Detective | Yes | No | No |

Acting roles

| Year | Title | Role |
|---|---|---|
| 1978 | Jaws 2 | Doug Fetterman |
| 1979 | Meeting Halfway | Unknown role |
| 1979 | Studs Lonigan | Young Paulie Haggerty |
| 1979 | All That Jazz | Young Joe Gideon |
| 1980 | Home Movies | Dennis Byrd |
| 1980 | Dressed to Kill | Peter Miller |
| 1981 | Kent State | Jeffrey Miller |
| 1982 | My Palikari | Chris Panakos |
| 1983 | Christine | Arnie Cunningham |
| 1984 | Single Bars, Single Women | Lionel |
| 1985 | The Legend of Billie Jean | Lloyd Muldaur |
| 1985 | Static | Ernie Blick |
| 1986 | Back to School | Jason Melon |
| 1986 | Combat Academy | Maxwell 'Max' Mendelsson |
| 1994 | I Love Trouble | Andy |
| 1997 | The Player | Unknown role |
| 2001 | Delivering Milo | Mr. Baumgartner |

=== Television ===
==== Director ====
| Year | Title | Episode(s) |
|---|---|---|
| 1993 | Wild Palms | "Hungry Ghosts" |
| 1993 | Wild Palms | "The Floating World" |
| 1994 | Homicide: Life on the Street | "Extreme Unction" |
| 1995 | Fallen Angels | "The Black Bargain" |
| 2002 | Shadow Realm/Night Visions | "Patterns" |
| 2005 | House M.D. | "Sports Medicine" |
| 2010 | Rubicon | "In Whom We Trust" |
| 2013 | Rectify | "Always Be There" (Also executive producer) |
| 2011–2013 | The Killing | "Beau Soleil" |
| 2011–2013 | The Killing | "Donnie or Marie" |
| 2011–2013 | The Killing | "Eminent Domain" |
| 2006–2013 | Dexter | "Truth Be Told" |
| 2006–2013 | Dexter | "The Dark Defender" |
| 2006–2013 | Dexter | "Morning Comes" |
| 2006–2013 | Dexter | "Our Father" |
| 2006–2013 | Dexter | "All in the Family" |
| 2006–2013 | Dexter | "Do You Take Dexter Morgan" |
| 2006–2013 | Dexter | "Dirty Harry" |
| 2006–2013 | Dexter | "Lost Boys" |
| 2006–2013 | Dexter | "In the Beginning" |
| 2006–2013 | Dexter | "Beautiful Day" |
| 2013–2014 | The Bridge | "The Beetle" |
| 2013–2014 | The Bridge | "Yankee" |
| 2014 | The Strain | "It's Not for Everyone" |
| 2014 | Masters of Sex | "Blackbird" |
| 2015 | The Returned | "Camille" (Also executive producer) |
| 2014–2015 | Nurse Jackie | "Nancy Wood" |
| 2014–2015 | Nurse Jackie | "Nice Ladies" |
| 2014–2017 | The Leftovers | "Two Boats and a Helicopter" |
| 2014–2017 | The Leftovers | "Ten Thirteen" |
| 2014–2017 | The Leftovers | "Don't Be Ridiculous" |
| 2017 | Better Call Saul | "Off Brand" |
| 2015–2017 | Fargo | "Did You Do This? No, You Did It!" |
| 2015–2017 | Fargo | "Loplop" |
| 2015–2017 | Fargo | "Aporia" |
| 2015–2017 | Fargo | "Somebody to Love" |
| 2018 | Legion | "Chapter 19" |
| 2013–2020 | Homeland | "Good Night" |
| 2013–2020 | Homeland | "Trylon and Perisphere" |
| 2013–2020 | Homeland | "Super Powers" |
| 2013–2020 | Homeland | "Fair Game" |
| 2013–2020 | Homeland | "The Man in the Basement" |
| 2013–2020 | Homeland | "False Friends" |
| 2020 | Dispatches from Elsewhere | "The Creator" |

==== Actor ====
| Year | Title | Role | Episode(s) |
|---|---|---|---|
| 1975 | Medical Center | Herbie | "The Price of a Child" |
| 1982 | American Playhouse | Chris Panakos | "My Palikari" |
| 1989 | Miami Vice | Prof. Terrence Baines | "Leap of Faith" |
| 1990 | WIOU | George Lewis | "Do the Wrong Thing" |
| 1990 | WIOU | George Lewis | "Mother Nature's Son" |
| 1993 | Brooklyn Bridge | Cousin Herbie | "The Wild Pitch" |
| 2009 | Dexter | Kyle Butler #2 | "Hello, Dexter Morgan" |
| 2018 | On Cinema | Himself | "The 5th Annual Live On Cinema Oscar Special" |

== Award nominations ==
Independent Spirit Awards
Best Screenplay – A Midnight Clear (1992)
Best First Feature – The Chocolate War (1988)

Sitges – Catalan International Film Festival
Best Film – The Singing Detective (2003)
