= Ilan Mitchell-Smith =

American academic and former actor (born 1969)

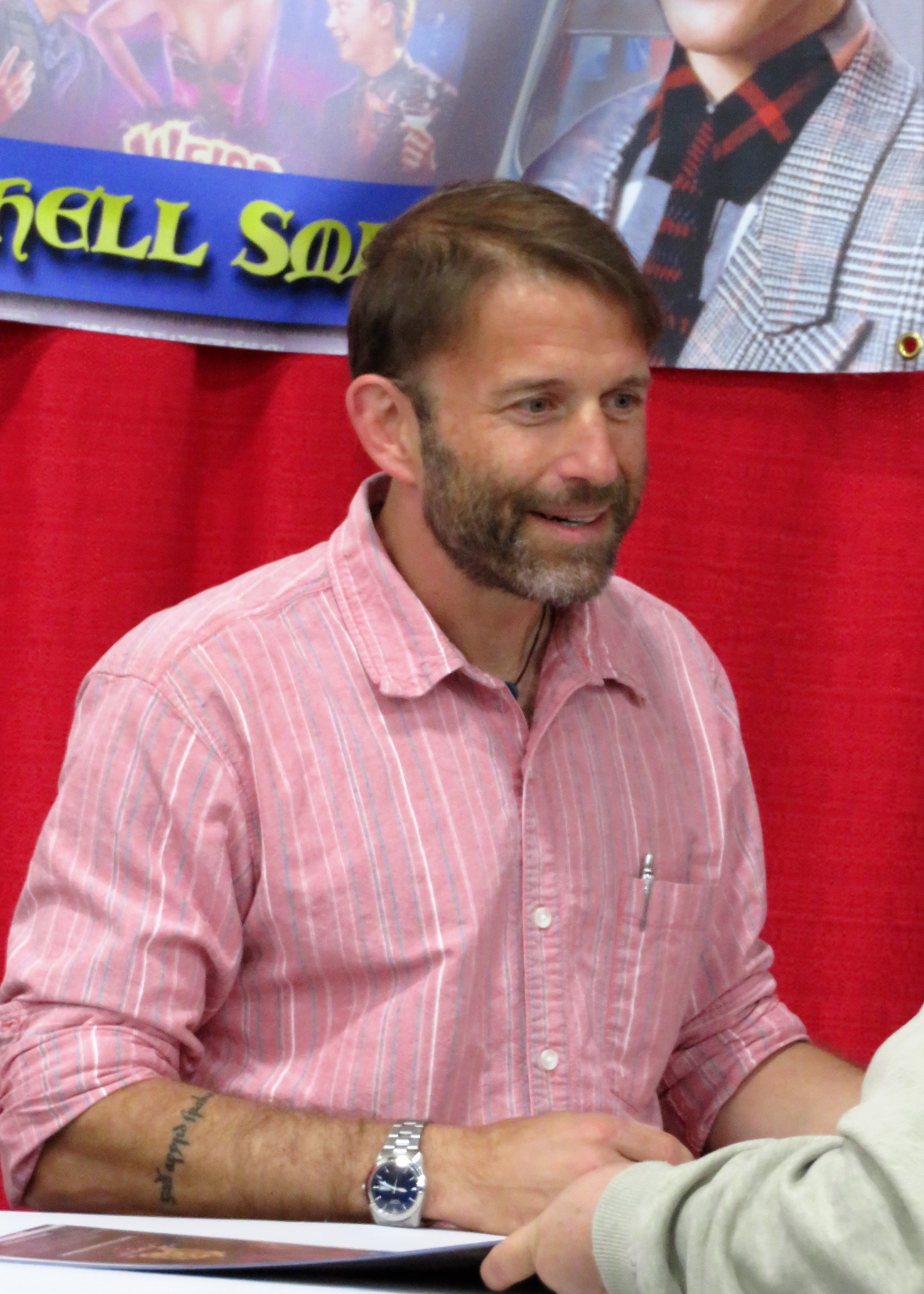
- Mitchell-Smith in May 2017
- Born: June 29, 1969 (age 57); New York City, New York, U.S.
- Education: University of California, Davis (AB); Fordham University (MA); Texas A&M University (PhD)
- Occupations: Actor; Professor
- Years active: 1983–1991, 2011–present (acting)
- Spouse: Susannah Demaree (m. 1995)
- Children: 2

Ilan Mitchell-Smith (born June 29, 1969) is an American academic and actor, best known as a co-star of the film Weird Science (1985) and Andy McCalister in Superboy.

== Acting career ==
Mitchell-Smith's first passion was ballet. He studied as a child as young as age 5 and won a scholarship to dance with the School of American Ballet. While there on his scholarship, he was discovered by a casting director and his film career began in 1982 at age 12 when he played a younger version of the title character in Sidney Lumet's Daniel. After a starring role in the 1984 film The Wild Life, he was cast as Wyatt Donnelly in the 1985 teen film Weird Science by writer/director John Hughes. The film focuses on two nerdy teenage boys who create a woman of their own (played by Kelly LeBrock), as they are unable to find girlfriends.

Mitchell-Smith starred in several other films and TV series, most notably The Chocolate War and Superboy; none of these brought him the same degree of recognition. He decided to leave acting entirely in 1991, his final role being a guest appearance on Silk Stalkings. Recently, Mitchell-Smith has performed select voiceover work (recording for two episodes—"Moon Warriors" and "Heads Will Roll"—of Fox's Axe Cop).

In 2017, Mitchell-Smith guest-starred in the fifth-season premiere of The Goldbergs, playing science teacher Mr. Connelly. The episode, entitled "Weird Science", was based on his film Weird Science, with series character Barry Goldberg believing he can make a girlfriend in the same manner as the movie.

== Academic career ==
Mitchell-Smith received his A.B. in Medieval Studies from University of California, Davis (UC Davis) and his M.A. in Medieval Studies from Fordham University. He received a doctoral degree from Texas A&M University in 2005. As of January 2020, he is an associate professor in the English department at California State University, Long Beach (CSU Long Beach) in Long Beach, California. For several years prior to his appointment at CSU Long Beach, he was a professor at Angelo State University in San Angelo, Texas. Mitchell-Smith publishes on chivalry in the later Middle Ages, and he also publishes on cinematic, television, and video-game versions of medieval culture.

== Table top gaming ==
Mitchell-Smith has published on Dungeons & Dragons, and was a staff writer for Talk Wargaming and wrote a column for Forces of Geek called "Playing the Nerd". He works as a technical writer and editor for smaller independent game producers, and he is an active tabletop gamer and an organizer of tabletop game events in Southern California. He has also written for British Tabletop Wargaming magazines such as Slingshot and Wargames, Soldiers and Strategy.

== Personal life ==
Mitchell-Smith was born in New York City, New York. His mother, Clary Mitchell-Smith, is a psychotherapist, and his father, Larry Smith, was an art history teacher.

Mitchell-Smith is married to Susannah Demaree, a psychotherapist in Southern California, whom he met at Santa Monica College in Santa Monica, California. They were married in 1995, and they have two children, born in 1998 and 2000.

Mitchell-Smith was diagnosed in 2014 with retinitis pigmentosa, and he is legally blind.

== Filmography ==
- 1983: How to Be a Perfect Person in Just Three Days as Milo Crimpley
- 1983: Daniel as Younger Daniel
- 1984: The Wild Life as Jim Conrad
- 1985: Weird Science as Wyatt Donnelly
- 1985: The Equalizer as Anthony Ganucci (TV series, one episode)
- 1988: Superboy as Andy McAlister (TV series, 27 episodes)
- 1988: Journey to the Center of the Earth as Bryan
- 1988: The Chocolate War as Jerry Renault
- 1989: Identity Crisis as Sebastian
- 1991: Silk Stalkings as Gabriel Evans (TV series, one episode)
- 2012: Axe Cop (TV series, two episodes; voice)
- 2013: The Goldbergs as Mr. Connelly (TV series, one episode: "Weird Science")
