= How to Be a Perfect Person in Just Three Days =

1984 American television film

- Based on: Be a Perfect Person in Just Three Days! by Stephen Manes
- Teleplay by: Bruce Harmon
- Directed by: Joan Micklin Silver
- Starring: Wallace Shawn; Ilan Mitchell-Smith; Hermione Gingold
- Music by: David Frank
- Country of origin: United States
- Original language: English

Production
- Executive producer: Frank Doelger
- Producer: Mark R. Gordon
- Cinematography: Barry Sonnenfeld
- Editor: Jay Freund
- Running time: 58 minutes
- Production company: Learning Corporation of America

Original release
- Network: PBS
- Release: October 8, 1984

How to Be a Perfect Person in Just Three Days is a 1984 American television family comedy film directed by Joan Micklin Silver and written by Bruce Harmon, based on the 1982 children's book Be a Perfect Person in Just Three Days! by Stephen Manes. It stars Wallace Shawn, Ilan Mitchell-Smith, and Hermione Gingold.

The film first aired on PBS on October 4, 1984, as part of the series WonderWorks, and was regularly shown on The Disney Channel in the mid-1980s.

== Plot ==
The film depicts a twelve-year-old boy named Milo, a hopeless klutz who happens upon a mysterious advertisement in the paper for becoming a perfect person. On offer is a three-day course devised by a peculiar man, Dr. Silverfish. Milo enrolls and manages to complete the strange tasks. Only after completing the course does Milo realize that perfection is a lot more boring than he thought it was (mainly because it involves never doing anything so as not to make mistakes).

== Cast ==
- Wallace Shawn as Professor Silverfish
- Ilan Mitchell-Smith as Milo Crimpley
- Hermione Gingold as Miss Sandwich
- Sarah Boyd as Jenny Hillard
- Kate McGregor-Stewart as Mrs. Crimpley
- Lenny Von Dohlen as Erik Crimpley
- Ned Boyd as Frankie Crimpley
- B.J. Barie as Norbert Sandhill
- John Rothman as Contest Judge
- Joey Ginza as Mr. Yamata
- Jodi Long as Mrs. Yamata
