= Larissa MacFarquhar =

American writer (born 1968)

- Born: 1968 (age 57–58); London, England
- Occupation: Writer
- Spouse: Philip Gourevitch
- Relatives: Roderick MacFarquhar (father)
- Writing career
- Period: 1998-present

Larissa MacFarquhar (born 1968) is an American writer known for her profiles in The New Yorker.

She is the daughter of British sinologist Roderick MacFarquhar. She was born in London, and moved to the United States at the age of 16.

MacFarquhar has been a staff writer at The New Yorker since 1998 and has written profiles on Barack Obama, Derek Parfit, Hilary Mantel, Robert Gottlieb, Richard Posner, Chimamanda Ngozi Adichie, Chelsea Manning and Aaron Swartz, among others. Her 2015 book Strangers Drowning: Impossible Idealism, Drastic Choices, and the Urge to Help explores the motivations of people who take altruism to extremes. She is married to the writer Philip Gourevitch.

== Selected bibliography ==
=== Books ===
- MacFarquhar, Larissa (2016). Strangers Drowning : Impossible Idealism, Drastic Choices, and the Urge to Help. Penguin Books. ISBN 0143109782.

=== Essays and reporting ===
- MacFarquhar, Larissa (Fall 1994). "Robert Gottlieb, The Art of Editing No. 1". Paris Review (132).
- MacFarquhar, Larissa (December 10, 2001). "The Bench Burner". The New Yorker.
- MacFarquhar, Larissa (September 5, 2011). "How to Be Good". The New Yorker.
- MacFarquhar, Larissa (October 15, 2012). "The Dead Are Real". The New Yorker.
- MacFarquhar, Larissa (March 3, 2013). "Requiem for a Dream". The New Yorker.
- MacFarquhar, Larissa (April 2, 2018). "Mind expander : Andy Clark believes that your thinking isn't all in your head". The New Yorker. Vol. 94, no. 7. pp. 62–73.
