= Weird Science (song) =

Single by Oingo Boingo

from the album Dead Man's Party
- B-side: "Weird Mama" (Ira and the Geeks)
- Released: 1985
- Recorded: 1985
- Genre: New wave; dance-rock
- Length: 6:10 (album version); 3:45 (single version)
- Label: MCA
- Songwriter: Danny Elfman
- Producers: Danny Elfman; Steve Bartek

Oingo Boingo singles chronology
"Gratitude" (1984)	"Weird Science" (1985)	"Just Another Day" (1986)

"Weird Science" is a song by American new wave band Oingo Boingo. Written by frontman Danny Elfman, it is the theme song to the Weird Science film and television series. It was released on the film's soundtrack, as well as Oingo Boingo's fifth studio album, Dead Man's Party (1985), in a longer mix. The song reached No. 45 on the US Billboard Hot 100, No. 21 on the US Dance Club Charts, and No. 81 in Canada. It is Oingo Boingo's most successful single.

== Recording ==
The song was spontaneously written by Elfman in his car while driving home to Los Angeles after a phone call from director John Hughes asking him to write a song (for his movie of the same name). Elfman claimed to have "heard the whole thing in [his] head" by the time he ran home to his studio to record his demo.

== Music video ==
The music video for "Weird Science" features the band performing in an abstract laboratory. The video appeared in a number of different edits when broadcast, some featuring clips from the John Hughes film and other versions without. Elfman later expressed embarrassment at the video, stating that he was "horrified" by the outcome and that it was the only Oingo Boingo music video in which he had not been involved with production. Elfman had long felt that the song, a more commercial musical style than most of the band's previous releases at the time, was "not really a part of [the band's] repertoire".

The video would later be parodied on TV show Beavis and Butt-Head, where the titular characters described it as "complicated", and Elfman himself poked fun at with "How come they didn't let that dude back in Duran Duran?" Elfman claimed that following this broadcast he decided he "never [wanted] to play this song again!"

== Track listing ==
=== 7-inch single ===
1. "Weird Science" – 3:45
2. "Weird Mama" by Ira and the Geeks – 2:50

=== 12-inch single ===
1. "Weird Science (Extended Dance Version)" – 6:38
2. "Weird Science" – 3:45

=== 12-inch promo single ===
1. "Weird Science (Weird Dub Bonus Beats)" – 6:00
2. "Weird Science (Boingo Dance Version)" – 5:38
3. "Weird Science (Extended Dance Version)" – 6:38

== Charts ==
Chart (1985–1986)	Position
Australia (Kent Music Report)	39
Canada	81
US Billboard Hot 100	45
US Cashbox Top 100	42
US Hot Dance/Disco Club Play (Billboard)	21

== See also ==
- Weird Science (TV series)
- Weird Science (film)
