= Whispered Secrets =

- Vinyl episode
- Episode no.: Episode 3
- Directed by: Mark Romanek
- Written by: Jonathan Tropper; Debora Cahn; Adam Rapp
- Cinematography by: David Franco
- Editing by: Kate Sanford
- Original release date: February 28, 2016
- Running time: 56 minutes

Guest appearances
- John Cameron Mitchell as Andy Warhol; Lena Olin as Mrs. Fineman; Ken Marino as Jackie Jervis; Annie Parisse as Andrea "Andie" Zito; Dustin Ingram as Alice Cooper; Armen Garo as Corrado Galasso; Bo Dietl as Joe Corso; Tina Benko as Gloria; Susan Heyward as Cece; Emily Tremaine as Heather; Ephraim Sykes as Marvin; MacKenzie Meehan as Penny; Griffin Newman as Casper; Jay Klaitz as Hal Underwood

Episode chronology
← Previous "Yesterday Once More"	Next → "The Racket"

"Whispered Secrets" is the third episode of the American period drama television series Vinyl. The episode was written by Jonathan Tropper, Debora Cahn, and Adam Rapp, and directed by Mark Romanek. It originally aired on HBO on February 28, 2016.

The series is set in New York City in the 1970s. It focuses on Richie Finestra, American Century Records founder and president, whose passion for music and discovering talent has gone by the wayside. With his American Century Records on the verge of being sold, a life-altering event rekindles Finestra's professional fire, but it may leave his personal life in ruins. In the episode, Richie considers his next move, while Clark tries to sign Alice Cooper as a solo act.

According to Nielsen Media Research, the episode was seen by an estimated 0.533 million household viewers and gained a 0.20 ratings share among adults aged 18–49. The episode received generally positive reviews from critics, praising the performances but criticizing the over-abundance of subplots.

== Plot ==
Richie (Bobby Cannavale) and Devon (Olivia Wilde) attend a banquet honoring Maury Gold (Paul Ben-Victor). Rival record exec Jackie Jervis (Ken Marino) gives a speech, in which he mocks the failed deal with PolyGram, something that Devon was not aware of. The previous night, Richie visited Lester Grimes (Ato Essandoh) to offer releasing some of his songs as a new album. Still angry over losing his voice, he refuses to get involved.

Richie meets with Hal Underwood (Jay Klaitz), the head of PR in American Century. As Richie discusses starting a sub-label, he is visited by Joe Corso (Bo Dietl). Corso is accompanied by his much younger girlfriend, a singer. He hands him over a demo, silently pointing out that Richie should seriously consider it. Richie is also visited by Maury and Corrado (Armen Garo), pointing out that he didn't say anything to the police.

In Connecticut, Devon asks Richie for money for one of her friend's fundraiser, which will renovate a Greenwich barn that could house a displaced Russian ballet company. Richie refuses to give her over $10,000 as needed, feeling it exceeds their interests. Desperate, she asks Andy Warhol (John Cameron Mitchell) to sign a portrait of her so she could sell it, which he accepts.

A&R executive Clark Morelle (Jack Quaid) runs into Alice Cooper (Dustin Ingram) during a recording session. Cooper becomes interested when Clark suggests signing him as a solo act and abandon his band. He invites Clark to a party, and he even takes him to play golf at a course. During a rehearsal, Cooper introduces Clark to the band, revealing that he wants him to go solo. The band then scares Clark by placing him on a guillotine. Cooper admits that he never considered Clark for anything, due to a previous bad encounter with Richie.

The Nasty Bits now perform cover songs under a different style, satisfying Julie (Max Casella) but disappointing Jamie (Juno Temple). During a performance, Richie expresses disdain for their new style. Jamie then gets Kip (James Jagger) to sign another song with their original style, impressing the crowd and Richie decides to sign them. At home, Richie is called by Corso, who reveals that the police has found Buck's corpse.

== Production ==
=== Development ===
In February 2016, HBO announced that the third episode of the series would be titled "Whispered Secrets", and that it would be written by Jonathan Tropper, Debora Cahn, and Adam Rapp, and directed by Mark Romanek. This was Tropper's first writing credit, Cahn's first writing credit, Rapp's first writing credit, and Romanek's first directing credit.

== Reception ==
=== Viewers ===
In its original American broadcast, "Whispered Secrets" was seen by an estimated 0.533 million household viewers with a 0.20 in the 18–49 demographics. This means that 0.20 percent of all households with televisions watched the episode. This was a 21% decrease in viewership from the previous episode, which was watched by 0.667 million household viewers with a 0.27 in the 18-49 demographics.

=== Critical reviews ===
"Whispered Secrets" received generally positive reviews from critics. Matt Fowler of IGN gave the episode a "good" 7.6 out of 10 and wrote in his verdict, "I don't know if I'm on board, or will ever get on board, with Richie's various issues and assorted (self-caused) problems. Bobby Cannavale is tremendous performer, but there's just so much bluster to Richie. And it works to distance me from him. Like last week though, the side stories all worked well. Especially Clark's long night of drinking with Alice Cooper."

Dan Caffrey of The A.V. Club gave the episode a "C+" grade and wrote, "Vinyl has kept its real-life characters more on the periphery thus far, resigned to bit parts and the occasional recurring role. So how come the historical-fiction conceit of tonight feels so out of place? How come, whenever a real musician begins interacting with someone made-up, the show starts to feel like Forrest Gump?"

Leah Greenblatt of Entertainment Weekly wrote, "Predictably, her rendition of 'Danny's Song' is terrible (or at least terribly mediocre). And Richie does not hold the world in a paper cup. His cup has bourbon in it, though, and he's probably going to need it for whatever comes next." Noel Murray of Vulture gave the episode a 4 star rating out of 5 and wrote, "Because of the frequency and obtrusiveness of those cameos, 'Whispered Secrets' may help viewers decide if they want to stick with Vinyl for the long haul. This is the most 'normal' episode of the show so far. Gone — for the most part — are the cocky pronouncements about the importance of rock ‘n’ roll, and the drug-fueled odysseys through New York's early 1970s demimonde. In their place: more down-to-earth scenes of people going about their daily routines, as they try to find some fulfillment in their professional and personal lives."

Gavin Edwards of The New York Times wrote, "Vinyl isn't the first TV show to fill out its cast of characters with a parade of real-life music stars from the past. [...] When a show pulls off this stunt, it can bring the past and the present into a dialogue — when it fails, it can feel like one long Halloween episode. Vinyl hasn't carved any pumpkins yet, but I worry that the show has a jumbo bag of fun-size Nestle Crunch stashed in the pantry." Dan Martin of The Guardian wrote, "It's in Vinyl's favour that it's doing such a handsome job as a love letter to music, because as a drama it's all over the place. Nearly a third of the way in and the show is still no closer to resolving its identity crisis. I've said it before, but this programme is proving so frustrating that it bears repeating."

Tony Sokol of Den of Geek gave the episode a 4 star rating out of 5 and wrote, "Dolphins fuck? Gazelles sing? Joe Corso may be a great record promotion man but he's still learning about common frames of reference. You can't always tell where the veiled references end and the threats and reminders begin." Robert Ham of Paste wrote, "For the first time, Vinyl actually roped me in. I liked watching the Nasty Bits turn around a pitiful label tryout by abandoning their Kinks cover in place of a snarling original number. I felt every bit of raw emotion that came out of the scene between Richie and Lester Grimes, the blues artist he used to manage. And, as a writer, I loved the rueful comedy that went on between Richie and the head of his PR department as they tried to find a positive spin on his decision to renege on the deal with Polygram. But for every peak on the show, there was an accompanying valley."
