= Victor Gourevitch =

American philosopher (1925–2020)

- Born: 13 July 1925; Berlin
- Died: 14 April 2020 (aged 94); New York

Education
- Education: University of Chicago (PhD)

Philosophical work
- Era: 21st-century philosophy
- Region: Western philosophy
- Institutions: Wesleyan University
- Main interests: political philosophy

Victor Gourevitch (13 July 1925 – 14 April 2020) was an American philosopher and William Griffin Professor of Philosophy Emeritus at Wesleyan University. He is known for his works on political philosophy.

He is the father of journalist Philip Gourevitch.
