= Dead Man's Party (album) =

Studio album by Oingo Boingo
- Released: October 28, 1985
- Recorded: April–August 1985
- Studio: Sunset Sound Factory (Hollywood)
- Genres: New wave; ska; pop rock
- Length: 41:45
- Label: MCA
- Producers: Danny Elfman, Steve Bartek

Oingo Boingo chronology
So-Lo (1984)	Dead Man's Party (1985)	Boi-ngo (1987)

Singles from Dead Man's Party
- 1. "Weird Science" Released: 1985; 2. "Just Another Day" Released: January 28, 1986; 3. "Dead Man's Party / Stay" Released: April 29, 1986; 4. "Stay / Heard Somebody Cry" Released: 1986

Dead Man's Party is the fifth album by American new wave band Oingo Boingo, released in 1985 by MCA Records. The album contains the only two singles by the band to chart on the Billboard Hot 100: "Weird Science" at number 45, and "Just Another Day" at number 85. The album was the band's first to be certified gold for sales of 500,000 units. The album cover art is a homage to the Mexican holiday Día de Los Muertos.

== Composition ==
Elfman stated that he wrote the album's lead single, "Weird Science", spontaneously in his car, after getting a call from director John Hughes about composing a song for his upcoming film of the same name. The song went on to become the band's most commercially successful single, which Elfman later regretted, as he believed it "just didn't feel like it was really a part of [the band's] repertoire".

Session outtakes include "Not My Slave" and "New Generation", both of which were released on the band's follow-up album, Boi-Ngo, in 1987.

== Reception ==
Allmusic rated the album three out of five stars, with reviewer Rick Anderson commenting: "The sound is still maybe just a bit too uptight and over-determined, but the horn charts are more focused and sophisticated, and Elfman has matured considerably as a lyricist."

According to an issue of the Oingo Boingo Fan Club newsletter, the song "Stay" became a hit in Brazil when it became the theme song for the Brazilian telenovela Top Model. That increased the popularity of the band in Brazil. The song became part of a Brazilian compilation album named "Stay".

== Reissue ==
In 2021, Rubellan Remasters issued a remastered version of Dead Man's Party on CD with seven bonus tracks.

== Track listing ==
All tracks are written by Danny Elfman.

Side one
No.	Title	Length
1.	"Just Another Day"	5:10
2.	"Dead Man's Party"	6:17
3.	"Heard Somebody Cry"	4:40
4.	"No One Lives Forever"	4:13

Side two
No.	Title	Length
1.	"Stay"	3:35
2.	"Fool's Paradise"	4:33
3.	"Help Me"	3:44
4.	"Same Man I Was Before"	3:23
5.	"Weird Science"	6:10
Total length:		41:45

=== 2021 CD bonus tracks ===
No.	Title	Length
10.	"Take Your Medicine"	4:31
11.	"Just Another Day (Single Version)"	4:01
12.	"Dead Man's Party (Short Version)"	3:48
13.	"Weird Science (Single Version)"	3:50
14.	"Stay (Stay Late Mix)"	6:00
15.	"Dead Man's Party (Party 'Til You're Dead Mix)"	8:36
16.	"Weird Science (Extended Dance Version)"	6:30
Total length:		79:01

== Charts ==
Chart (1985–1986)	Position
US Billboard 200	95
Australia (Kent Music Report)	65

== Personnel ==
Oingo Boingo

- Danny Elfman – vocals, rhythm guitar
- John Avila – bass guitars, vocals
- Steve Bartek – guitars
- Mike Bacich – keyboards
- John Hernandez – drums, percussion
- Sam Phipps – tenor saxophone
- Leon Schneiderman – baritone saxophone, alto saxophone
- Dale Turner – trumpet, trombone

Technical

- Danny Elfman – co-producer
- Steve Bartek – co-producer
- Michael Frondelli – mixing
- Bill Jackson – engineer
- David Leonard – engineer, mixing ("Weird Science")
- Stuart Farusho – second engineer (recording)
- Paul Levy – second engineer (recording)
- Mike Kloster – second engineer (recording)
- Judy Clapp – second engineer (mixing)
- Charlie Pakkari – second engineer (mixing)
- Laura Engel – studio production assistant
- Wally Traugott – mastering
- Larry Vigon – art direction, design
- Jayme Odgers – art direction, photography
- Celeste Williams – clay figure creation
