= Strangers Drowning =

2015 book by Larissa MacFarquhar

Strangers Drowning: Impossible Idealism, Drastic Choices, and the Urge to Help
- Author: Larissa MacFarquhar
- Language: English
- Publisher: Penguin Books
- Publication date: September 29, 2015
- Publication place: United States
- Media type: Print; e-book; audiobook
- Pages: 336
- ISBN: 978-1-5942-0433-3

Strangers Drowning: Impossible Idealism, Drastic Choices, and the Urge to Help is a 2015 non-fiction book about extreme altruists, authored by The New Yorker writer Larissa MacFarquhar. It's structured as a series of profiles on people she refers to as "do-gooders" including the humanitarian Dorothy Granada, Baba Amte and his family, and a couple who adopted 20 children.

== Themes ==
MacFarquhar explores the concepts of morality, effective altruism and utilitarianism, alternating chapters between profiles and essays on the ambivalence and mistrust that's prevalent in literature and society towards people who dedicate themselves to helping others in extreme ways.

The book's title refers to an adaptation of the thought experiment proposed by philosopher Peter Singer in his essay Famine, Affluence, and Morality:

if I am walking past a shallow pond and see a child drowning in it, I ought to wade in and pull the child out. This will mean getting my clothes muddy, but this is insignificant while the death of the child would presumably be a very bad thing. ... the principle takes ... no account of proximity or distance. It makes no moral difference whether the person I can help is a neighbor's child ten yards from me or a Bengali whose name I shall never know, ten thousand miles away.

In the introduction of the book, MacFarquhar relates a variation of the trolley problem in which a professor and student discuss the morality in a choice between rescuing either one's mother or two strangers from drowning.
