= We Wish to Inform You That Tomorrow We Will Be Killed with Our Families =

1998 non-fiction book by Philip Gourevitch

We Wish to Inform You That Tomorrow We Will Be Killed With Our Families
- First edition
- Author: Philip Gourevitch
- Cover artist: Anne Fink
- Language: English
- Subject: Current affairs/history
- Genre: Non-fiction
- Publisher: Farrar, Straus and Giroux
- Publication date: 1998
- Publication place: United States
- Pages: 356
- ISBN: 0-312-24335-9 (Picador USA)
- OCLC: 41712890
- Dewey Decimal: 364.15/1/0967571 22
- LC Class: DT450.435 .G68 2004

We Wish to Inform You That Tomorrow We Will Be Killed With Our Families: Stories from Rwanda is a 1998 non-fiction book by The New Yorker writer Philip Gourevitch about the 1994 genocide against the Tutsi, in which an estimated one million Tutsi were killed.

== Summary ==
The book describes Gourevitch's travels in Rwanda after the Rwandan Genocide during which he interviews survivors and gathers information. Gourevitch retells survivors' stories, and reflects on the meaning of the genocide.

The title comes from an April 15, 1994, letter written to Pastor Elizaphan Ntakirutimana, president of the Seventh-day Adventist Church's operations in western Rwanda, by seven Adventist pastors who had taken refuge with other Tutsis in an Adventist hospital in the locality of Mugonero in Kibuye prefecture. Gourevitch accused Ntakirutimana of aiding the killings that happened in the complex the next day. Ntakirutimana was eventually convicted by the International Criminal Tribunal for Rwanda. The book not only explains the genocide's peak in 1994, but the history of Rwanda leading up to the major events.

== Reception and criticism ==
This book won numerous awards, including the 1998 National Book Critics Circle Award, the Los Angeles Times Book Prize, the 1999 Guardian First Book Award and the George Polk Award for Foreign Reporting.

Africanist René Lemarchand criticizes the book:

What is missing from Gourevitch's account is the how and why of the killings. It is one thing to describe the horror, another to explain the motivations that occasioned the carnage. ... The absence of attention to the history of the country creates a portrait of a genocide that is insensitive to the complexity of the circumstances. In essence, Gourevitch's story reduces the butchery to the tale of bad guys and good guys, innocent victims and avatars of hate. His frame of reference is the Holocaust.

The book was featured as one of the first Brotherhood 2.0 book club books. In 2019, it was ranked by Slate as one of the 50 best nonfiction books of the past 25 years.

== See also ==
- Léon Mugesera
