= Mark Gordon (actor) =

American actor (1926–2010)

- Born: Mark Joshua Gordon; May 19, 1926; New York City, U.S.
- Died: August 12, 2010 (aged 84); New York City, U.S.
- Occupation: Actor
- Years active: 1952–2001
- Spouse: Barbara Gordon
- Children: Keith Gordon

Mark Joshua Gordon (May 19, 1926 – August 12, 2010) was an American film, stage and television actor.

== Life and career ==
Gordon was born in New York City. He began his stage career in 1952, appearing in the Broadway play Desire Under the Elms. He then began his screen career in 1963, appearing in the CBS drama television series East Side West Side.

Later in his career, Gordon appeared in film and television programs including Take the Money and Run, Hawaii Five-O, The Mary Tyler Moore Show, A New Leaf, Don't Drink the Water, The F.B.I., Hawkins, Starsky & Hutch, The New Dick Van Dyke Show, Lotsa Luck, The Nickel Ride, Kojak and Hawkins. He also appeared in stage productions including Of Mice and Men, The Sign in Sidney Brustein's Window, and The Moon Besieged.

In 2001, Gordon retired from acting, last appearing in the NBC comedy drama television series Ed.

== Death ==
Gordon died on August 12, 2010 of lung cancer in New York, at the age of 84.
