= Philip Gourevitch =

American journalist (born 1961)

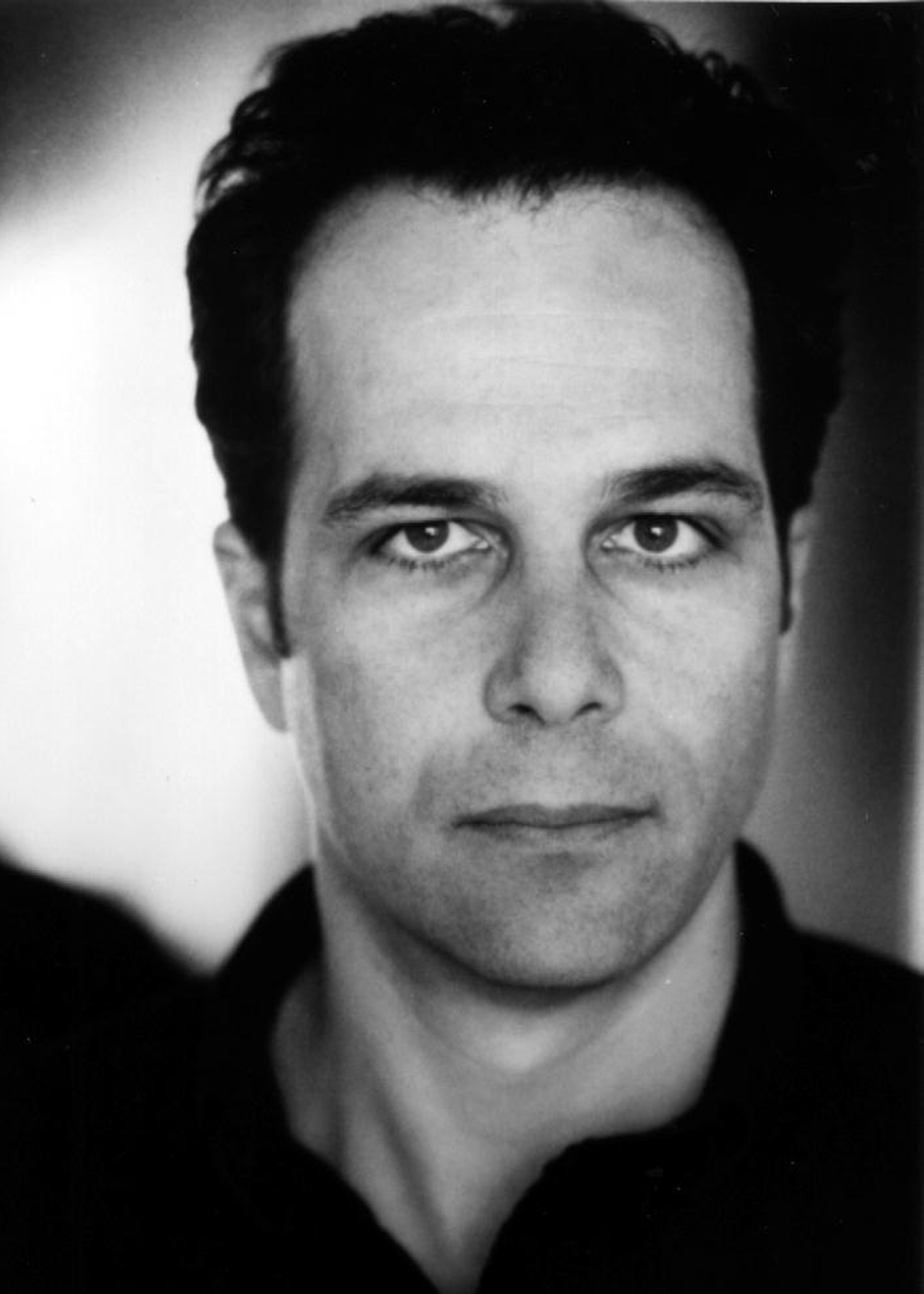
- Gourevitch in 2006
- Born: 1961 (age 64–65); Philadelphia, Pennsylvania, US
- Education: Choate Rosemary Hall; Cornell University; Columbia University
- Occupations: Author, journalist
- Notable work: We Wish to Inform You That Tomorrow We Will Be Killed with Our Families (1998)
- Spouse: Larissa MacFarquhar

Philip Gourevitch (born 1961), an American author and journalist, is a longtime staff writer for The New Yorker and a former editor of The Paris Review.

His most recent book is The Ballad of Abu Ghraib (2008), an account of Iraq's Abu Ghraib prison under the American occupation. He became widely known for his first book, We Wish to Inform You That Tomorrow We Will Be Killed with Our Families (1998), which tells the story of the 1994 Rwandan genocide.

== Background and education ==
Gourevitch was born in Philadelphia, Pennsylvania, to painter Jacqueline Gourevitch and philosophy professor Victor Gourevitch, a translator of Jean Jacques Rousseau. He and his brother Marc, a physician, spent most of their childhood in Middletown, Connecticut, where their father taught at Wesleyan University from 1967 to 1995. Gourevitch graduated from Choate Rosemary Hall in Wallingford, Connecticut.

Gourevitch knew that he wanted to be a writer by the time he went to Cornell University. He took a break for three years in order to concentrate fully on writing before eventually graduating in 1986. In 1992 he received a Masters of Fine Arts in fiction from the Writing Program at Columbia University. Gourevitch went on to publish some short fiction in literary magazines, before turning to non-fiction.

== Career ==
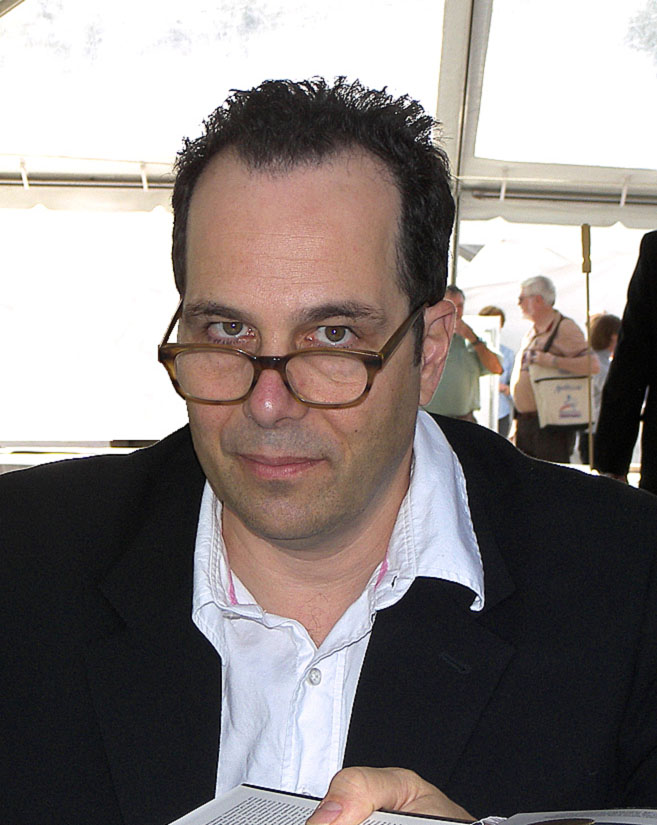
Gourevitch at a 2008 book signing in Austin, Texas

=== New York ===
Gourevitch worked for The Forward from 1991 to 1993, first as New York bureau chief and then as Cultural Editor. He left to pursue a career as a freelance writer, publishing articles in numerous magazines, including Granta, Harper's, The New York Times Magazine, Outside, and The New York Review of Books, before joining The New Yorker. He has also written for many other magazines and newspapers, and has sat on the board of judges for the PEN/Newman's Own free expression award.

=== Rwanda ===
Gourevitch became interested in Rwanda in 1994, as he followed news reports of the genocide. Frustrated by his inability to understand the event from afar, he began visiting Rwanda in 1995, and over the next two years made nine trips to the country and to its neighbors (Zaire, Burundi, Uganda, Tanzania) to report on the genocide and its aftermath.

External videos
- Booknotes interview with Gourevitch on We Wish to Inform You, November 22, 1998, C-SPAN
- Presentation by Gourevitch on A Cold Case, August 14, 2001, C-SPAN

His book We Wish to Inform You That Tomorrow We Will Be Killed with Our Families was published in 1998, and it won the National Book Critics Circle Award, the George Polk Book Award, the Los Angeles Times Book Award, the Overseas Press Club's Cornelius Ryan Award, the New York Public Library's Helen Bernstein Award, the PEN/Martha Albrand Award for First Nonfiction, and in England, The Guardian First Book Award. Africanist René Lemarchand stated, "That the story of Rwanda is at all known in the United States today owes much to the work of Philip Gourevitch and Alison Des Forges. He has been described by the British newspaper The Observer as "the world's leading writer on Rwanda".

=== Campaign journalism ===
Gourevitch published a second book in 2001. Titled A Cold Case, it is about a double homicide in Manhattan that remained unsolved for 30 years. In 2004 Gourevitch was assigned to cover the 2004 U.S. presidential election for The New Yorker.

=== The Paris Review ===
He was named editor of The Paris Review in March 2005 and held that position through March 2010. He is also the editor of The Paris Review Interviews, Volumes I-IV. The first volume, for which he wrote the introduction, was published in 2006.

== Honors ==
Gourevitch's work has received numerous awards, including the National Book Critics Circle Award, the George Polk Book Award, the Los Angeles Times Book Award, the Overseas Press Club's Cornelius Ryan Award, the New York Public Library's Helen Bernstein Award, and in England, The Guardian First Book Award. He held a 2012-'13 Cullman Fellowship at the New York Public Library. In 2017, he was awarded a Whiting Creative Nonfiction Grant to complete his book You Hide That You Hate Me And I Hide That I Know. His books have been translated into ten languages.

== Personal life ==
Gourevitch is married to The New Yorker writer Larissa MacFarquhar. He lives in New York City.

== Bibliography ==
=== Books ===
- Gourevitch, Philip (1998). We Wish to Inform You That Tomorrow We Will Be Killed with Our Families. Farrar, Straus and Giroux.
- Gourevitch, Philip (2001). A Cold Case. Farrar Straus Giroux.
- Gourevitch, Philip & Errol Morris (2008). Standard Operating Procedure/The Ballad of Abu Ghraib. Penguin Press.

=== Essays and reporting ===
- Gourevitch, Philip (November 19, 2012). "Higher powers". The Talk of the Town. Aftermath Dept. The New Yorker. Vol. 88, no. 36. p. 32.
- — (December 3, 2012). "Bear". Gut Course. The New Yorker. Vol. 88, no. 38. pp. 92–93.
- — (December 16, 2013). "Nelson Mandela". The Talk of the Town. Postscript. The New Yorker. Vol. 89, no. 41. pp. 23–24.
- — (April 21, 2014). "Remembering in Rwanda". The Talk of the Town. Comment. The New Yorker. Vol. 90, no. 9. pp. 31–32.
- — (January 8, 2015). "The Pen Vs. the Gun". The New Yorker.
- — (May 4, 2015). "Search and Rescue". The Talk of the Town. Comment. The New Yorker. Vol. 91, no. 11. pp. 17–18.
