= A Cold Case =

2002 novel by Philip Gourevitch

- Author: Philip Gourevitch
- Language: English
- Genre: True crime
- Publisher: Picador
- Publication date: July 10, 2002
- Publication place: United States
- Media type: Print (Paperback)
- Pages: 192 pp
- ISBN: 978-0-312-42002-4
- OCLC: 49582857
- Dewey Decimal: 364.15/23/097471 21
- LC Class: HV6534.N5 G68 2002

A Cold Case is a 2002 work of nonfiction by Philip Gourevitch. A film adaptation of the book starring Tom Hanks was attempted, but the project did not enter production.

== Plot summary ==
A Cold Case follows real-life chief investigator Andy Rosenzweig from the Manhattan District Attorney's office as he investigates the 1970 murders of Richie Glennon and Pete McGinn, a case which was seemingly closed too soon. An ex-con, Frank Gilbert Koehler, is finally arrested in 1997.

== Film adaptation ==
A Cold Case was originally slated to have a film adaptation starring Tom Hanks after the actor's performances in The Terminal (2004) and The Ladykillers (2004). Director Mark Romanek was signed to helm the project with a script by John Sayles and Eric Roth, but when Hanks chose to do The Polar Express (2004) instead, the project came to a halt.
