= Weird Science (film) =

1985 film by John Hughes

- Theatrical release poster by Tom Jung
- Directed by: John Hughes
- Written by: John Hughes
- Based on: "Made of the Future" by Al Feldstein
- Produced by: Joel Silver
- Starring: Anthony Michael Hall; Ilan Mitchell-Smith; Kelly LeBrock
- Cinematography: Matthew F. Leonetti
- Edited by: Mark Warner; Christopher Lebenzon; Scott Wallace
- Music by: Ira Newborn
- Production companies: Hughes Entertainment; Silver Pictures
- Distributed by: Universal Pictures
- Release date: August 2, 1985 (United States)
- Running time: 94 minutes
- Country: United States
- Language: English
- Budget: $7.5 million
- Box office: $38.9 million

Weird Science is a 1985 American teen science fantasy comedy film written and directed by John Hughes and starring Anthony Michael Hall, Ilan Mitchell-Smith and Kelly LeBrock. It is based on the 1951 pre-Comics Code comic "Made of the Future" by Al Feldstein, which appeared in the magazine of the same name. The title song was written and performed by American new wave band Oingo Boingo. The film was released by Universal Pictures on August 2, 1985 and grossed $38.9 million against a $7.5 million budget while receiving mixed reviews. The film is regarded as a cult classic.

== Plot ==
Nerdy social outcast students Gary Wallace and Wyatt Donnelly of Shermer High School are humiliated by senior jocks Ian and Max for swooning over their cheerleader girlfriends Deb and Hilly. Humiliated and disappointed at their direction in life and wanting more, Gary convinces the uptight Wyatt that they need a boost in popularity in order to win their crushes away from Ian and Max. Alone for the weekend with Wyatt's parents gone, Gary is inspired by the 1931 film Frankenstein to create a virtual woman using Wyatt's computer, infusing her with everything they can conceive of to make the perfect dream woman.

After they hook electrodes to a doll and hack into a government computer system for more power, a power surge creates Lisa, a beautiful and intelligent woman with reality-altering powers. She promptly produces a pink 1959 Cadillac Eldorado convertible to take the boys to a blues dive bar in Chicago, using her powers to procure fake IDs for them.

They return home drunk, where Chet, Wyatt's mean older brother, extorts $175 from Wyatt in exchange for his silence. Lisa agrees to keep herself hidden from him, but she realizes that Gary and Wyatt, while sweet, are very uptight and need to unwind. After another humiliating experience at the mall when Max and Ian pour a slushie on Gary and Wyatt in front of a crowd, Lisa tells the bullies about a party at Wyatt's house, before driving off in a Porsche 928 she conjured for Gary.

Despite Wyatt's protests, Lisa insists that the party take place. She meets Gary's parents, Al and Lucy, who are shocked and dismayed at the things she says and her frank manner, to Gary's embarrassment. After she pulls a stainless steel .44 Magnum handgun on them (later revealed to Gary to be a water pistol), she alters their memories so that Lucy forgets about the conflict; however, Al forgets altogether that they have a son.

At the Donnelly house, the party has spun out of control. Gary and Wyatt take refuge in the bathroom, where they resolve to have fun despite having embarrassed themselves in front of Deb and Hilly. In Wyatt's bedroom, Ian and Max convince Gary and Wyatt to recreate the events that created Lisa, but the process fails. Lisa chides them over their misuse of the process to impress their tormentors. She also explains that they forgot to connect the doll; thus, with the bare but live electrodes resting on a magazine page showing a Pershing II medium-range ballistic missile, a real missile emerges, erupting through the floor and ceiling of the house.

Meanwhile, Wyatt's grandparents arrive and confront Lisa about the party, but she places them in a frozen, catatonic state and hides them in a kitchen cupboard. Lisa realizes that the boys need a challenge to boost their confidence and has a gang of mutant bikers crash the party, causing chaos and terrorizing the guests.

The bikers take Deb and Hilly hostage. Wyatt and Gary confront the bikers, which causes Deb and Hilly to fall in love with the boys. The bikers leave. The next morning, Chet returns from duck hunting to discover his home in disarray: A localized snowstorm fills his room, and a huge missile stands in the middle of the house. Lisa has the boys escort the girls home while she talks to Chet alone. Gary and Wyatt proclaim their feelings, and both girls reciprocate.

Returning to the house, the boys discover Chet, now transformed into a foul, talking toad-like creature. He apologizes to Wyatt for his behavior. Upstairs, Lisa assures them that Chet will soon return to normal, and, realizing that her purpose is complete, tearfully hugs both Gary and Wyatt before de-materializing. As she leaves, the house is "magically" cleaned and everything transformed back to normal, including Chet. Wyatt's parents return home, completely unaware that anything unusual has happened. Later, Lisa turns up as the new gym teacher at Shermer High School.

== Cast ==
- Anthony Michael Hall as Gary Wallace
- Ilan Mitchell-Smith as Wyatt Donnelly
- Kelly LeBrock as Lisa
- Bill Paxton as Chet Donnelly
- Suzanne Snyder as Deb
- Judie Aronson as Hilly
- Robert Downey Jr. (credited as Robert Downey) as Ian
- Robert Rusler as Max
- Vernon Wells as Lord General (a character reflecting his Mad Max 2 role)
- Britt Leach as Al Wallace
- Barbara Lang as Lucy Wallace
- Michael Berryman as mutant biker

Hughes regular John Kapelos plays Dino, while Playboy Playmate Kym Malin (May 1982) has a cameo as a girl playing piano.

The film incorporated clips of Dr. Frankenstein and his monster (played by Colin Clive and Boris Karloff taken from the films Frankenstein and Bride of Frankenstein. A clip of David Lee Roth taken from the music video for his recording of "Just a Gigolo/I Ain't Got Nobody" also appears.

== Production ==
Model Kelly Emberg was initially cast as Lisa, but left after two days due to creative differences. LeBrock was hired as her replacement. Vernon Wells reprises his memorable biker character Wez from Mad Max 2, but is credited in this movie as "Lord General". Filming was originally planned to begin on September 24, 1984, in Skokie, Illinois, but was ultimately delayed to October 2, 1984, and the location changed to the Northbrook Court Shopping Mall in Northbrook, Illinois.

Most of the location shooting was filmed around neighborhoods outside of Chicago, Illinois, whereas the rest of production was filmed on sound stages and the backlot at Universal City Studios in Los Angeles, California. Production wrapped on December 21, 1984. The production was kept closed in order to keep the film's plot a secret.

== Reception ==
Roger Ebert, who gave the film three out of four stars, called LeBrock "wonderful" in her role and thought that as a result the film was "funnier, and a little deeper, than the predictable story it might have been". Janet Maslin of The New York Times wrote that "Mr. Hughes shows that he can share the kind of dumb joke that only a 14-year-old boy could love. There are enough moviegoing 14-year-old boys to make a hit out of Weird Science, of course, but for the rest of the population, its pandering is strenuous enough to be cause for alarm."

Variety wrote, "Weird Science is not nearly as weird as it should have been and, in fact, is a rather conventional kids-in-heat film, and a chaste one at that. Director-writer John Hughes squanders the opportunity to comment on the power struggle between the sexes for a few easy laughs." Gene Siskel of the Chicago Tribune gave the film one-and-a-half stars out of four and wrote, "What a disappointment Weird Science is! A wonderful writer-director has taken a cute idea about two teenage Dr. Frankensteins creating a perfect woman by computer and turned it into a vulgar, mindless, special-effects-cluttered wasteland."

Sheila Benson of the Los Angeles Times described LeBrock as "triumphant" and the "film's greatest asset", but thought the film's appeal was limited to audiences of 15-year-old boys and "maybe the 16-year-olds, if they aren't yet too fussy". Rita Kempley of The Washington Post wrote, "Unbelievably, John Hughes, the maker of Sixteen Candles and The Breakfast Club, writes and directs this snickering, sordid, special effects fantasy, with Kelly LeBrock in a demeaning role as love slave to a pair of 15-year olds."

On the review aggregator website Rotten Tomatoes, the film holds an approval rating of 60% based on 40 reviews, with an average rating of 5.7/10. The website's critics consensus reads, "Hardly in the same league as John Hughes' other teen movies, the resolutely goofy Weird Science nonetheless gets some laughs via its ridiculous premise and enjoyable performances." On Metacritic, the film has a score of 46 out of 100, indicating "mixed or average" reviews.

=== Box office ===
It grossed $23,834,048 in North America and $15.1 million in other territories, totaling $38,934,048 worldwide.

== Soundtrack ==
The film's theme song, "Weird Science", was performed by Oingo Boingo and written by the band's frontman, Danny Elfman. The soundtrack album was released on MCA Records. "Tesla Girls" by OMD appeared in the film but was omitted from the album.

Side one

1. "Weird Science" – Oingo Boingo – 3:48
2. "Private Joy" – Cheyne – 4:17
3. "The Circle" – Max Carl – 3:46
4. "Turn It On" – Kim Wilde – 4:40
5. "Deep in the Jungle" – Wall of Voodoo – 3:48

Side two

1. "Do Not Disturb (Knock Knock)" – The Broken Homes – 3:42
2. "Forever" – Taxxi – 3:53
3. "Why Don't Pretty Girls Look at Me" – The Wild Men of Wonga – 3:30
4. "Method to My Madness" – The Lords of the New Church – 3:17
5. "Eighties" – Killing Joke – 3:50
6. "Weird Romance" – Ira and the Geeks – 2:10

== Legacy ==
=== Television series ===
A television series based on the film ran for 88 episodes, from 1994 to 1998. Following the same basic plot as the film, the series stars Vanessa Angel as Lisa, Michael Manasseri as Wyatt, John Mallory Asher as Gary, and Lee Tergesen as Chet.

=== Remake and sequel ===
As of 2013, Universal Studios was planning a Weird Science remake with original producer Joel Silver returning, and Michael Bacall writing the film. The film was set to attempt to distinguish itself from the original Weird Science by being an edgier comedy, in line with 21 Jump Street and The Hangover, which were R-rated; the studio stated the rating for this Weird Science remake was not certain at that stage of the movie's development. However, nothing of the remake has materialized since. In 2017, Ilan Mitchell-Smith speculated about his own idea for a sequel to Weird Science which would star Channing Tatum.
