= The Secret of My Success (song) =

Single by Night Ranger

from the album Big Life and The Secret of My Success Soundtrack
- B-side: "Carry On"
- Released: March 1987
- Genre: Hard rock, glam metal
- Length: 4:26
- Label: MCA
- Songwriter(s): Jack Blades; David Foster; Michael Landau; Tom Keane
- Producer(s): David Foster

Night Ranger singles chronology
"Goodbye" (1985)	"The Secret of My Success" (1987)	"Hearts Away" (1987)

"The Secret of My Success" is a song performed by Night Ranger from their album Big Life as well as on the soundtrack to the 1987 comedy film, The Secret of My Success.

The star of the film, Michael J. Fox, was the person to request the band to write and record the song. It reached No. 12 on the Hot Mainstream Rock Tracks chart and No. 64 on the Billboard Hot 100 chart in the U.S. The song was nominated for the Golden Globe Award in the category of Best Original Song in 1988, but lost to "(I've Had) The Time of My Life," the central theme of Dirty Dancing, played by Bill Medley and Jennifer Warnes. The video for the song featured Vince Neil, Tommy Lee and "Weird Al" Yankovic acting as a horn section.

== Personnel ==
Band members

- Brad Gillis - lead and rhythm guitars, backing vocals
- Jeff Watson - lead and rhythm guitars
- Jack Blades - bass, lead and backing vocals
- Alan Fitzgerald - keyboards, piano
- Kelly Keagy - drums, lead and backing vocals, percussion

Additional musicians

- David Foster - additional keyboards
- Michael Boddicker - additional synth programming
- David "Reverend" Boruff - additional synth programming
- Tris Imboden - additional drum overdubs
- Michael Landau - additional guitar
- Bill Champlin - additional background vocals

== Charts ==
Chart (1987)	Peak position
US Billboard Hot 100	64
US Mainstream Rock (Billboard)	12
