= The Secret of My Success (1987 film) =

1987 film by Herbert Ross

- Theatrical release poster
- Directed by: Herbert Ross
- Screenplay by: Jim Cash; Jack Epps Jr. A.J. Carothers
- Story by: A.J. Carothers
- Produced by: Herbert Ross
- Starring: Michael J. Fox; Helen Slater; Richard Jordan; Margaret Whitton
- Cinematography: Carlo Di Palma
- Edited by: Paul Hirsch
- Music by: David Foster
- Production company: Rastar
- Distributed by: Universal Pictures
- Release date: April 10, 1987
- Running time: 111 minutes
- Country: United States
- Language: English
- Budget: $12 million
- Box office: $111 million

The Secret of My Success (sometimes stylized as The Secret of My Succe$s) is a 1987 American comedy film produced and directed by Herbert Ross and starring Michael J. Fox and Helen Slater. The screenplay was written by A.J. Carothers, Jim Cash and Jack Epps Jr. from a story written by Carothers. It was filmed on location in Manhattan.

The Secret of My Success was released by Universal Pictures on April 10, 1987. The film received mixed reviews from critics and grossed $111 million against a $12 million budget.

== Plot ==
Brantley Foster is a recent college graduate who has moved to New York City, where he has accepted an entry-level job as a financier. Upon arriving, he discovers that the company has been taken over by a rival. As a result, Brantley is laid off before even starting work.

After several interviews for other jobs, he is unsuccessful due to over- or underqualification or having no experience. Brantley ends up working in the mailroom of the Pemrose Corporation, directed by his "uncle" Howard Prescott, a distant relative. Pemrose was founded by Howard's father-in-law. Howard achieved the presidency by marrying his boss's daughter, Vera Pemrose. Brantley meets Vera by driving her home in a company limo. She persuades him to stay for a swim and seduces him.

Seeing Howard arrive, Brantley and Vera realize that she is his aunt by marriage. She had seduced him out of revenge against her husband for having an affair with a woman at the office. Brantley narrowly escapes the mansion without being spotted by Howard.

After inspecting company reports, Brantley realizes that Howard and most of his fellow executives are making pointless or damaging decisions. Using his access to the mailroom and his understanding of the company, he creates the identity of Carlton Whitfield, a new executive.

While handling two jobs, Brantley sparks romantic interest from Christy Wills, a fellow financial wizard who recently graduated from Harvard. Howard, unbeknownst to Brantley, is having an affair with Christy. When Howard asks her to spy on Carlton Whitfield, whom he suspects is a corporate spy for Donald Davenport, she falls in love with "Whitfield", not knowing he is actually Brantley. The Pemrose Corporation is preparing for its impending hostile takeover. If Davenport Corporation absorbs Pemrose, all workers will get fired, but Howard and his aide Art Thomas will retain their jobs.

Howard believes the company should cut every area, but that would make Davenport begin his hostile takeover. Brantley pitches the idea with Christy to expand the business to prevent the takeover. Later, at a corporate party at Howard and Vera's home, Vera introduces Brantley to three financiers to whom he discusses his ideas about the company.

Brantley's double identity is discovered when he, Christy, Vera, and Howard end up in the same bedroom after the party. Brantley and Christy end their blossoming relationship. He gets fired from his job as Whitfield, as does Christy for refusing to continue her affair with Howard. Vera is divorcing Howard since she found out about his affair with Christy and his plan to propose to her.

Christy and Brantley reconcile, conceiving a revenge plan together with Vera. They raise enough cash, bonds, and stocks to take control of the Pemrose Corporation and, with the help of the financiers from the party, proceed with a hostile takeover bid of Davenport's corporation.

Vera, hating Howard for his inept business practices that were driving her father's empire into the ground, tells the board that she now controls the majority of the voting stock. She replaces him with Brantley, with Jean (Carlton's secretary), Christy, and Melrose (Brantley's mailroom colleague) at his side to prevent the takeover and keep everyone's jobs safe. Brantley and Christy start planning their future together, personal as well as professional.

== Cast ==
- Michael J. Fox as Brantley Foster/Carlton Whitfield
- Helen Slater as Christy Wills
- Richard Jordan as Howard Prescott
- Margaret Whitton as Vera Pemrose Prescott
- John Pankow as Fred Melrose
- Fred Gwynne as Donald Davenport
- Gerry Bamman as Art Thomas
- Carol Ann Susi as Jean
- Drew Snyder as Burt Foster
- Elizabeth Franz as Grace Foster
- John Capodice as Man in KRS Building
- Christopher Murney as Barney Rattigan
- Mark Margolis as Elevator Repairman
- Mercedes Ruehl as Sheila
- Christopher Durang as Davis
- Bill Fagerbakke as Ron
- Cindy Crawford as Herself (uncredited)
- Bruce McGill as W. Shaw (uncredited)

== Soundtrack ==
The Secret of My Success (Music from the Motion Picture Soundtrack)

Soundtrack album by Various Artists
- Released: April 10, 1987
- Genre: Soundtrack
- Label: MCA Records
- Producers: David Foster; Neil Geraldo; Daryl Hall; Tom "T-Bone" Wolk; Arthur Barrow

Singles from The Secret of My Success Soundtrack
- 1. "The Secret of My Success" Released: March 28, 1987

The soundtrack was released on LP and cassette tape on April 10, 1987. Seven of the 10 tracks were produced, and either written or co-written, by David Foster, who also scored the film and has three tracks of his own on the album.

Not all of the songs featured in the film are included on the soundtrack, or, at least not in the same version. The film version of the song "The Secret of My Success" is slightly different, and also features a mini-instrumental version. The film version of "I Burn for You" does not feature vocals, whereas the soundtrack version does. The "Restless Heart" track from the film has a different title ("Something I Gotta Do"), and different lyrics than the soundtrack version.

The popular songs "Walking on Sunshine" by Katrina & The Waves and "Oh Yeah" by Yello are heard in the film but do not appear on the soundtrack.

The soundtrack peaked at No. 131 on the Billboard 200.

The theme from the picture "The Secret of My Success", performed by Night Ranger, was one of the songs that competed for the Golden Globe Award for Best Original Song in 1988. The winner was "(I've Had) The Time of My Life", the theme from Dirty Dancing, performed by Bill Medley and Jennifer Warnes.

Track listing

1. "The Secret of My Success" (performed by Night Ranger)
2. "Sometimes the Good Guys Finish First" (performed by Pat Benatar)
3. "I Burn for You" (performed by Danny Peck and Nancy Shanks)
4. "Riskin' a Romance" (performed by Bananarama)
5. "Gazebo" (performed by David Foster)
6. "The Price of Love" (performed by Roger Daltrey)
7. "Water Fountain" (performed by David Foster)
8. "Don't Ask the Reason Why" (performed by Restless Heart)
9. "3 Themes" (performed by David Foster)
10. "Heaven and the Heartaches" (performed by Taxxi)

== Reception ==
=== Critical response ===
The film received a mixed response from critics. Roger Ebert in the Chicago Sun-Times wrote, "The Secret of My Success seems trapped in some kind of time warp, as if the screenplay had been in a drawer since the 1950s and nobody bothered to update it." He concluded "Fox provides a fairly desperate center for the film. It could not have been much fun for him to follow the movie's arbitrary shifts of mood, from sitcom to slapstick, from sex farce to boardroom brawls." Ebert's colleague Gene Siskel called the film "staggeringly bad" and devoid of both laughs and excitement. He further said it had "no moral values," criticizing Fox's character as climbing the corporate ladder while offering no insight or commentary on the business world or his company's ethics.

However, Vincent Canby, writing in The New York Times, felt it was "close to inspired when the ambitious Brantley finds himself leading two lives", although he noted that "Hanging over The Secret of My Success is the long shadow of Frank Loesser's classic musical How to Succeed in Business Without Really Trying."

On the review aggregator website Rotten Tomatoes, 49% of 43 critics' reviews are positive, with an average rating of 5.5/10. The website's consensus reads: "A miscast Michael J. Fox gives The Secret of My Success all the madcap energy he can muster, but it isn't enough to overcome confused direction and a recycled plot." Metacritic, which uses a weighted average, assigned the film a score of 36 out of 100, based on 16 critics, indicating "generally unfavorable" reviews. Audiences polled by CinemaScore gave the film an average grade of "B+" on an A+ to F scale.

=== Box office ===
The film opened on April 10, 1987, and debuted at number one at the box office, taking $7.8 million in its opening weekend. It stayed at No. 1 for five weeks, and was in the top ten films for two months.

The film grossed $66.995 million in the US, becoming the 7th highest-grossing film in the United States for the year 1987, and outgrossing films such as RoboCop and Predator. The film went on to gross an additional $44 million worldwide, giving it a total of $111 million. Additionally, the film made $29.856 million through video rentals.

== Musical ==
In 2020, a musical based on the film was mid-run for its world premiere and pre-Broadway tryout at the Paramount Theatre in March 2020 with Sydney Morton (Christy Lockhart) and Billy Harrigan Tighe (Brantley Foster/Carlton Whitfield) as leads and Greenberg directing when production was shut down due to the coronavirus pandemic. It had been scheduled to run from February 21 – March 29, and the final performance was March 12, as Illinois governor J. B. Pritzker shut down all performance venues starting March 13.

== See also ==
- Raju Ban Gaya Gentleman
