= Static (1985 film) =

1985 film by Mark Romanek

- Home video release poster
- Directed by: Mark Romanek
- Screenplay by: Keith Gordon; Mark Romanek
- Produced by: Amy Ness
- Starring: Keith Gordon; Amanda Plummer; Bob Gunton
- Cinematography: Jeff Jur
- Edited by: Emily Paine
- Production company: NFI Productions
- Release dates: October 1985 (Chicago); September 10, 1986 (United States)
- Running time: 93 minutes
- Country: United States
- Language: English
- Budget: $1 million

Static is a 1985 American comedy-drama film directed by Mark Romanek. The film stars Keith Gordon, Amanda Plummer, and Bob Gunton, and was released in 1985 by NFI Productions. It was shot in Page, Arizona and Lake Powell, Arizona. The film was co-written by the film's star Keith Gordon and director Mark Romanek, in his directorial debut, before he went on to direct numerous music videos for much of his career.

== Plot ==
A quirky, out-of-place worker at a crucifix factory invents a device he claims can show pictures of Heaven. Discouraged and confused by the inability of those around him to see anything but a screenful of static, he charismatically hijacks a bus of friendly elderly people in order to get media attention for his invention.

== Cast ==
- Keith Gordon as Ernie Blick
- Amanda Plummer as Julia Purcell
- Bob Gunton as Frank
- Janice Abbott as Sonya
- Reathel Bean as Fred Savins
- Kitty Mei-Mei Chen as Li
- Barton Heyman as Sheriff William Orling
- Jane Hoffman as Emily Southwick
- Lily Knight as Patty
- Joel Krehbeil as Deputy Tom Terrence
- Eugene Lee as Dale
- Jack Murakami as North
- Mike Murakami as South
- Uma Ridenhour as Sarah
- Mark Gordon as TV Announcer

== Award and nominations ==
| Year | Award | Category | Recipient | Result |
|---|---|---|---|---|
| 1986 | Sundance Film Festival | Grand Jury Prize (Dramatic) | Mark Romanek | Nominated |
