= Solace for Tired Feet =

- The Leftovers episode
- Episode no.: Season 1 Episode 7
- Directed by: Mimi Leder
- Written by: Damon Lindelof; Jacqueline Hoyt
- Cinematography by: Todd McMullen
- Editing by: Michael Ruscio
- Production code: 4X5707
- Original air date: August 10, 2014
- Running time: 57 minutes

Guest appearances
- Scott Glenn as Kevin Garvey, Sr.; Wayne Duvall as Louis Vitello; Paterson Joseph as Holy Wayne; Janel Moloney as Mary Jamison

Episode chronology
← Previous "Guest"	Next → "Cairo"
- The Leftovers season 1

"Solace for Tired Feet" is the seventh episode of the first season of the American supernatural drama television series The Leftovers, based on the novel of the same name by Tom Perrotta. The episode was written by series creator Damon Lindelof and supervising producer Jacqueline Hoyt, and directed by Mimi Leder. It was first broadcast on HBO in the United States on August 10, 2014.

The series is set three years after the "Sudden Departure" – an event which saw 2% of the world's population (approximately 140 million people) disappear and profoundly affected the townspeople. The characters of police chief Kevin Garvey and his family (wife Laurie, son Tom, daughter Jill and father Kevin Sr.) are focal points, alongside grieving widow Nora Durst, her brother Reverend Matt Jamison, and the mysterious cult-like organization the Guilty Remnant (GR), led by Patti Levin. In the episode, Kevin's father escapes from the mental institution, forcing Kevin to track him down. Meanwhile, Tom starts to question Holy Wayne's plans while on the run.

According to Nielsen Media Research, the episode was seen by an estimated 1.58 million household viewers and gained a 0.8 ratings share among adults aged 18–49. The episode received extremely positive reviews from critics, who praised the performances, character development, directing and themes, although some still expressed criticism for the pacing.

== Plot ==
While taking down posters with Gladys' face, Laurie (Amy Brenneman) sees Jill (Margaret Qualley). They both share a silent look at each other before Jill leaves. At the woods, Jill, Aimee (Emily Meade), Adam (Max Carver) and Scott Frost (Charlie Carver) play a game where each one gets inside a refrigerator. Jill decides to get in to surpass a record. After almost half an hour inside, Jill breaks the record. However, the handle breaks off, trapping her inside. As she panics, her friends desperately try to save her. Suddenly, Kevin Sr. (Scott Glenn) shows up and opens it, freeing Jill. He asks her not to tell her dad, Kevin (Justin Theroux), before running off.

Kevin's date with Nora (Carrie Coon) is ruined when Meg (Liv Tyler) and another GR member stakes her house, although his mood is lifted when Nora sprays them with her water hose, with both agreeing to another date. That night, Jill asks Kevin why her grandfather was institutionalized, to which Kevin explains it was for attacking a person. Jill then informs him that he escaped, prompting Kevin to send units to track him down. He warns Lucy (Amanda Warren), but she makes it clear his father will go find him. That night, Kevin experiences upsetting visions while sleeping.

The next day, Kevin finds that his father went on a rampage on a library while attempting to retrieve money. Kevin Sr. appears in his house with Jill alone. He talks with her when Kevin arrives home, having been alerted by Jill. He handcuffs him and takes him to the station but Kevin Sr. escapes when they run into a protest of GR members. Later, Kevin finds evidence that his father is staying with Matt (Christopher Eccleston) and angrily calls him to get his location. He meets with his father at a diner, where he arrests him, but not before his father hands him the May 1972 issue of National Geographic, confusing Kevin. After Kevin Sr.'s psychotic episode, Kevin finally arrests his father, sending him back to the hospital. Kevin then visits Nora and they have sex.

Months on the run, Tom (Chris Zylka) is taking care of Christine (Annie Q.), whose condition is worsening. While buying medicine, Tom is called by Holy Wayne (Paterson Joseph), who asks him to take half of his money and place it on a mailbox. He does the task but decides to follow the person who takes the money. He tracks him to a motel room, finding him with a pregnant Asian woman. The man, Bryan, reveals that Wayne used the same words of motivation for him, which makes Tom reconsider his loyalty to Wayne. The woman shoots Tom in the hand, causing him to leave. When he returns to his apartment, he ignores Wayne's call and destroys his phone to avoid any more contact. However, he is shocked when he finds Christine in the bathtub with her newborn baby, a girl.

== Production ==
=== Development ===
In July 2014, the episode's title was revealed as "Solace for Tired Feet" and it was announced that series creator Damon Lindelof and supervising producer Jacqueline Hoyt had written the episode while Mimi Leder had directed it. This was Lindelof's seventh writing credit, Hoyt's second writing credit, and Leder's second directing credit.

== Reception ==
=== Viewers ===
The episode was watched by 1.58 million viewers, earning a 0.8 in the 18-49 rating demographics on the Nielson ratings scale. This means that 0.8 percent of all households with televisions watched the episode. This was a 7% increase from the previous episode, which was watched by 1.47 million viewers with a 0.7 in the 18-49 demographics.

=== Critical reviews ===
"Solace for Tired Feet" received extremely positive reviews from critics. The review aggregator website Rotten Tomatoes reported a 100% approval rating with an average rating of 8.3/10 for the episode, based on 11 reviews. The site's consensus states: "'Solace for Tired Feet' features more of the fine acting that The Leftovers is known for - as well as a welcome, and atypical, influx of forward plot movement."

Matt Fowler of IGN gave the episode an "amazing" 9 out of 10 and wrote in his verdict, "Directed by Mimi Leder and written by Lindelof and Jacqueline Hoyt, 'Solace for Tired Feet' gelled the series together like never before. The Leftovers has been great on its own as a dizzying portrait of broken people, but now it's deftly teasing us with a 'higher purpose' for those splintered folks. And as Kevin makes big steps in his life to normalize, his sanity is still going to remain a haunting issue. In the world of The Leftovers, there are probably thousands of interesting stories to tell, but this episode seemed to answer, for now, why we might be following these specific people. When Kevin, Sr. said 'This is your invitation', he was inviting us along for the ride as well."

Sonia Saraiya of The A.V. Club gave the episode a "B+" grade and wrote, "Twice now, The Leftovers has delivered episodes that create an intense sense of identification. We get close to a single character, experiencing a transformative life event alongside them in what have been the series' two strongest hours to date. Those episodes have demonstrated how rich stories in this post-departure world can be, but they've also had the effect of making the other episodes of the series feel like missed opportunities. When The Leftovers dives deep, it transcends; when it drops in, it can feel like aimless, speculative fiction to the point of lacking a point at all."

Alan Sepinwall of HitFix wrote, "The focus was tight enough on Kevin and the search for his father to work, and it featured excellent performances from both Justin Theroux and, especially, Scott Glenn." Jeff Labrecque of Entertainment Weekly wrote, "Last week, on what must qualify as a feel-good episode of The Leftovers, Nora and Kevin had a spark. Though they live in the same small town and Kevin is close family friends with her brother, the minister, they somehow never crossed paths until recently. Both now divorced, they agreed to a promising dinner date. But as Kevin reminded viewers with the above p.s., he hasn't exactly turned the page on his own demons, and the episode 'Solace for Tired Feet' dragged us back into his disturbed psyche, which struggles to differentiate between what is real and imagined."

Kelly Braffet of Vulture gave the episode a 4 star rating out of 5 and wrote, "Suddenly, after weeks of stellar acting, great dialogue, and no forward motion whatsoever - after I had pretty much given up on anything even vaguely resembling forward motion - this week's episode threw it at us left and right." Nick Harley of Den of Geek gave the episode a 3 star rating out of 5 and wrote, "Christine had her baby and Kevin's got a May 1972 National Geographic and a new dog. But so what? By no means was this a bad piece of television, it just feels inconsequential, like I could have skipped it and tuned in next week to find everything largely the same, and then figured the rest out on my own. I want to like this show, but they make it so hard."

Matt Brennan of Slant Magazine wrote, "After the powerful one-two punch of 'Gladys' and 'Guest', 'Solace for Tired Feet' is a useful respite, pausing to establish the constellation of conflicts driving the first season of The Leftovers to its conclusion." Michael M. Grynbaum of The New York Times wrote, "Not bad for Nora, and not bad for The Leftovers, which turned in a solid showing with 'Solace for Tired Feet', an hour that propelled the show's plot into some intriguing corners even as it reminded us that many of its characters remain unknowable, even seven episodes in."
