= Gladys (The Leftovers) =

- The Leftovers episode
- Episode no.: Season 1 Episode 5
- Directed by: Mimi Leder
- Written by: Damon Lindelof; Tom Perrotta
- Cinematography by: Todd McMullen
- Editing by: Henk Van Eeghen
- Production code: 4X5705
- Original air date: July 27, 2014
- Running time: 55 minutes

Guest appearances
- Wayne Duvall as Detective Louis Vitello; Marceline Hugot as Gladys

Episode chronology
← Previous "B.J. and the A.C."	Next → "Guest"
- The Leftovers season 1

"Gladys" is the fifth episode of the first season of the American supernatural drama television series The Leftovers, based on the novel of the same name by Tom Perrotta. The episode was written by series creators Damon Lindelof and Tom Perrotta, and directed by Mimi Leder. It was first broadcast on HBO in the United States on July 27, 2014.

The series is set three years after the "Sudden Departure" – an event which saw 2% of the world's population (approximately 140 million people) disappear and profoundly affected the townspeople. The characters of police chief Kevin Garvey and his family (wife Laurie, son Tom, daughter Jill and father Kevin Sr.) are focal points, alongside grieving widow Nora Durst, her brother Reverend Matt Jamison, and the mysterious cult-like organization the Guilty Remnant (GR), led by Patti Levin. In the episode, unknown assailants kill Gladys, a loyal member of the Guilty Remnant. Kevin investigates the murder, despite the police's indifference to her death.

According to Nielsen Media Research, the episode was seen by an estimated 1.59 million household viewers and gained a 0.8 ratings share among adults aged 18–49. The episode received generally positive reviews from critics, who praised the performances and character development. Gladys' death scene drew polarized reactions, with some deeming it appropriate for the series' tone while others criticized its violent nature.

== Plot ==
Hostility between the GR and Mapleton residents has increased after the former broke into their houses to remove photos of their departed families. One night, a member of the GR, Gladys (Marceline Hugot), is taken by assailants to the woods. Taping her to a tree, she is brutally struck by thrown stones. She breaks her vow of silence, begging them to stop. The assailants ignore her and keep throwing stones, killing her. The GR searches for her that night, with Laurie (Amy Brenneman) running into Dean (Michael Gaston) killing dogs, before finding Gladys' body.

Kevin (Justin Theroux) is visited by Patti (Ann Dowd), who informs him of Gladys' death. The police show no respect, some mocking her death while others refuse to cooperate and warn GR that their presence is a threat. With very little support among the department, Kevin is forced to investigate on his own. To complicate matters, Detective Louis Vitello (Wayne Duvall) informs ATFEC for investigation. After Laurie leaves a hospital due to a panic attack, Patti takes her to a motel room. The next day, Laurie is instructed to meet her at a diner wearing non-white clothes. Patti surprises Laurie by speaking, inviting her to do the same for the day.

On a suggestion of Lucy (Amanda Warren), Kevin announces a curfew, which angers some of the citizens. The board rejects the petition for a curfew, unwilling to ruin their lives for GR. Kevin decides to visit the GR, suggesting they should use whistles, although they are not interested in his idea. Back at the diner, Patti tells Laurie that they are in the same place where she dined with Gladys, who wanted comfort after her son died. Even when she motivated her to speak, Gladys did not speak, just like Laurie. As they leave, Patti orders a doggy-bag and writes 'Neil' on it, which she leaves filled with something in front of a house.

Kevin decides to visit the morgue to check Gladys' body, bringing along Matt (Christopher Eccleston), who knew her and wants to pray for her. At the morgue, Kevin discovers that ATFEC already retrieved the body, which prevents Kevin from investigating any further. He contacts the agent in charge, who claims that the case is now in the hands of the ATFEC. The agent also offers Kevin a chance in wiping out the GR in Mapleton, which Kevin refuses. A distraught Kevin informs Jill (Margaret Qualley) about his incoming divorce. While Meg (Liv Tyler) is ready to become a permanent member of GR, Laurie interrupts Matt's vigil for Gladys outside with her new whistle. At an ATFEC processing center, agents burn many corpses from a truck, including Gladys'.

== Production ==
=== Development ===
In June 2014, the episode's title was revealed as "Gladys" and it was announced that series creators Damon Lindelof and Tom Perrotta had written the episode while Mimi Leder had directed it. This was Lindelof's fifth writing credit, Perrotta's second writing credit, and Leder's first directing credit.

== Reception ==
=== Viewers ===
The episode was watched by 1.59 million viewers, earning a 0.8 in the 18-49 rating demographics on the Nielson ratings scale. This means that 0.8 percent of all households with televisions watched the episode. This was a slight decrease from the previous episode, which was watched by 1.62 million viewers with a 0.8 in the 18-49 demographics.

=== Critical reviews ===
"Gladys" received generally positive reviews from critics. The review aggregator website Rotten Tomatoes reported a 92% approval rating with an average rating of 7.4/10 for the episode, based on 12 reviews. The site's consensus states: "'Gladys' opens with a horrific gut-punch and concludes with a bitter confrontation, successfully mixing in some familiar themes and surprising moments along the way."

Matt Fowler of IGN gave the episode an "amazing" 9 out of 10 and wrote in his verdict, "'Gladys' gave us our most harrowing moment of violence on the show to date while bringing Matt into the main Kevin/GR storyline in a very cool, intriguing way. The show also managed to make the GR sympathetic, though their choices still stand as being ultimately destructive and selfish. Despite all they ostensibly deny themselves. In fact, I wonder what the percentage rate comparison is of people whose families have been ripped apart by the Departure and those who've lost members to the GR. Kevin's been cracking all along, but this episode saw a few more characters - Laurie, Patti, Jill - break down in different ways, crushed under the sheer weight of their current lives."

Sonia Saraiya of The A.V. Club gave the episode a "B" grade and wrote, "There are a lot of types of religious life out there. A lot of types of people. And a bunch of those people even watch HBO. It's ridiculous that the show isn't trying to reach me — isn't trying to reach across the counter and tell the story of Faisal (which is the credited, never-spoken name of the Indian clerk). There's a bunch of us who understand the world differently. And as the leftovers of Mapleton said in the bar in the first episode: 'We're still here.'"

Alan Sepinwall of HitFix wrote, "Doing a single-POV story every week – especially one with as narrow a focus as 'Two Boats and a Helicopter' – isn't an easy thing to pull off, nor does it seem like what Lindelof and Perrotta want to do, given the size and scope of the broken world they're depicting. But 'Gladys' does a very effective job of splitting the difference between the tunnel vision of episode 3 and the broader ensemble pieces we've gotten in the other installments. It's a bigger episode featuring most of the cast, but the entire story and every bit of emotional conflict spills out of the single awful act of Gladys from the Guilty Remnant being stoned to death." Jeff Labrecque of Entertainment Weekly wrote, "Her murder presented the Garveys-Chief and Laurie-with independent spiritual tests. Each was tempted to abandon the path they've chosen, to relent and take an easier way out."

Kelly Braffet of Vulture gave the episode a 3 star rating out of 5 and wrote, "This episode, like every episode so far, had some gripping moments. But there's no longer any avoiding it: Not enough is happening in this series. Which is incredibly frustrating, because in many ways it's so damn good." Nick Harley of Den of Geek gave the episode a 3.5 star rating out of 5 and wrote, "This episode of The Leftovers was the first time where the show's pacing felt familiar, along with all of its ugliness. The episode also created some sort of urgency that wasn't quite present before. The show is still not without its problems, it can't figure out what to do with Jill at all and can still seem a little too self-impressed with its symbolism, but it still seems like we're building to something. What that something is just better be worth it."

Matt Brennan of Slant Magazine wrote, "With 'Gladys', an enthralling portrait of what happens when the urge to move on collides with the persistence of grief, The Leftovers joins the ranks of television's must-see dramas." Daniel McDermon of The New York Times wrote, "The Leftovers is clearly a show with a surplus of signs and symbols. Faithful viewers are left to wonder which, if any, they are meant to divine. And to hope that there's a greater purpose."
