= Guest (The Leftovers) =

- The Leftovers episode
- Episode no.: Season 1 Episode 6
- Directed by: Carl Franklin
- Written by: Damon Lindelof; Kath Lingenfelter
- Cinematography by: Todd McMullen
- Editing by: David Eisenberg
- Production code: 4X5706
- Original air date: August 3, 2014
- Running time: 51 minutes

Guest appearances
- Paterson Joseph as Holy Wayne; Sebastian Arcelus as Doug Durst; Billy Magnussen as Marcus; Tom Noonan as Casper

Episode chronology
| ← Previous "Gladys" | Next → "Solace for Tired Feet" |
- The Leftovers season 1

"Guest" is the sixth episode of the first season of the American supernatural drama television series The Leftovers, based on the novel of the same name by Tom Perrotta. The episode was written by series creator Damon Lindelof and supervising producer Kath Lingenfelter, and directed by Carl Franklin. It was first broadcast on HBO in the United States on August 3, 2014.

The series is set three years after the "Sudden Departure" – an event which saw 2% of the world's population (approximately 140 million people) disappear and profoundly affected the townspeople. The characters of police chief Kevin Garvey and his family (wife Laurie, son Tom, daughter Jill and father Kevin Sr.) are focal points, alongside grieving widow Nora Durst, her brother Reverend Matt Jamison, and the mysterious cult-like organization the Guilty Remnant (GR), led by Patti Levin. In the episode, Nora attends a Departure-related conference in New York City as part of her job at the Department of the Sudden Departure.

According to Nielsen Media Research, the episode was seen by an estimated 1.47 million household viewers and gained a 0.7 ratings share among adults aged 18–49. The episode received critical acclaim, with critics praising Carrie Coon's performance, as well as the writing, character development and emotional tone.

== Plot ==
Nora (Carrie Coon), working as a fraud investigator for the Department of the Sudden Departure (DSD), interviews a man about his departed husband to know if his claims are true. After grocery shopping, Nora throws away many unopened food items and replaces them with new ones in the event that her family will return. In the evening, she calls an escort. She asks the escort, Angel, to shoot her while she wears a bulletproof vest. Angel reluctantly shoots her and flees the scene. After a few seconds, Nora awakes.

Nora files for divorce from her husband Doug, a Departed who cheated on her with their children's preschool teacher. As she leaves the courthouse, she meets Kevin (Justin Theroux), who is also filing for divorce. In an abrupt moment, Nora invites him to come with her to Miami, confusing him and causing her to leave. As part of her job, she attends a Departure-related conference in New York City. At her hotel, she finds that her ID badge has already been claimed, forcing her to take a "guest" badge. She tries to find the woman who claims to be her, finding she registered her name on a list. She is invited by a man named Marcus (Billy Magnussen) to a party at his suite, which she decides to attend. After heavily drinking, she kisses Marcus's replica, as he makes replicas of Departed for a living.

After waking up from hangover, she is kicked out of the hotel by security, claiming she made property damages during the night. She forges a false ID badge to enter, but is caught again. She convinces security to check the woman claiming to be her, finding that she is giving a talk at the panel. Nora confronts the woman, who rants that the DSD is hiding information from the public. At the bar, she meets Patrick Johansen, a man who lost four members of his family in the Departure and subsequently wrote a bestselling book explaining how he moved on. Nora questions him about his beliefs that it was possible to move on, claiming that it is impossible to do so.

As she leaves the hotel, a man approaches her, having overheard her conversation. He invites her to an apartment, where she meets Holy Wayne (Paterson Joseph). Wayne claims that he helped Johansen in taking away his pain, with his talk causing Nora to cry. Wayne then hugs her, calming her. She returns to Mapleton, where she is visited by Kevin. He asks her out on a date, which she accepts. Later, Nora continues her job interviewing Departed's familiars. She asks her the last question, if the Departed are in a better place. The woman replies no, which contrasts the general consensus of her interviewees.

== Production ==
=== Development ===
In July 2014, the episode's title was revealed as "Guest" and it was announced that series creator Damon Lindelof and supervising producer Kath Lingenfelter had written the episode while Carl Franklin had directed it. This was Lindelof's sixth writing credit, Lingenfelter's second writing credit, and Franklin's second directing credit.

== Reception ==
=== Viewers ===
The episode was watched by 1.47 million viewers, earning a 0.7 in the 18-49 rating demographics on the Nielson ratings scale. This means that 0.7 percent of all households with televisions watched the episode. This was a 8% decrease from the previous episode, which was watched by 1.59 million viewers with a 0.8 in the 18-49 demographics.

=== Critical reviews ===
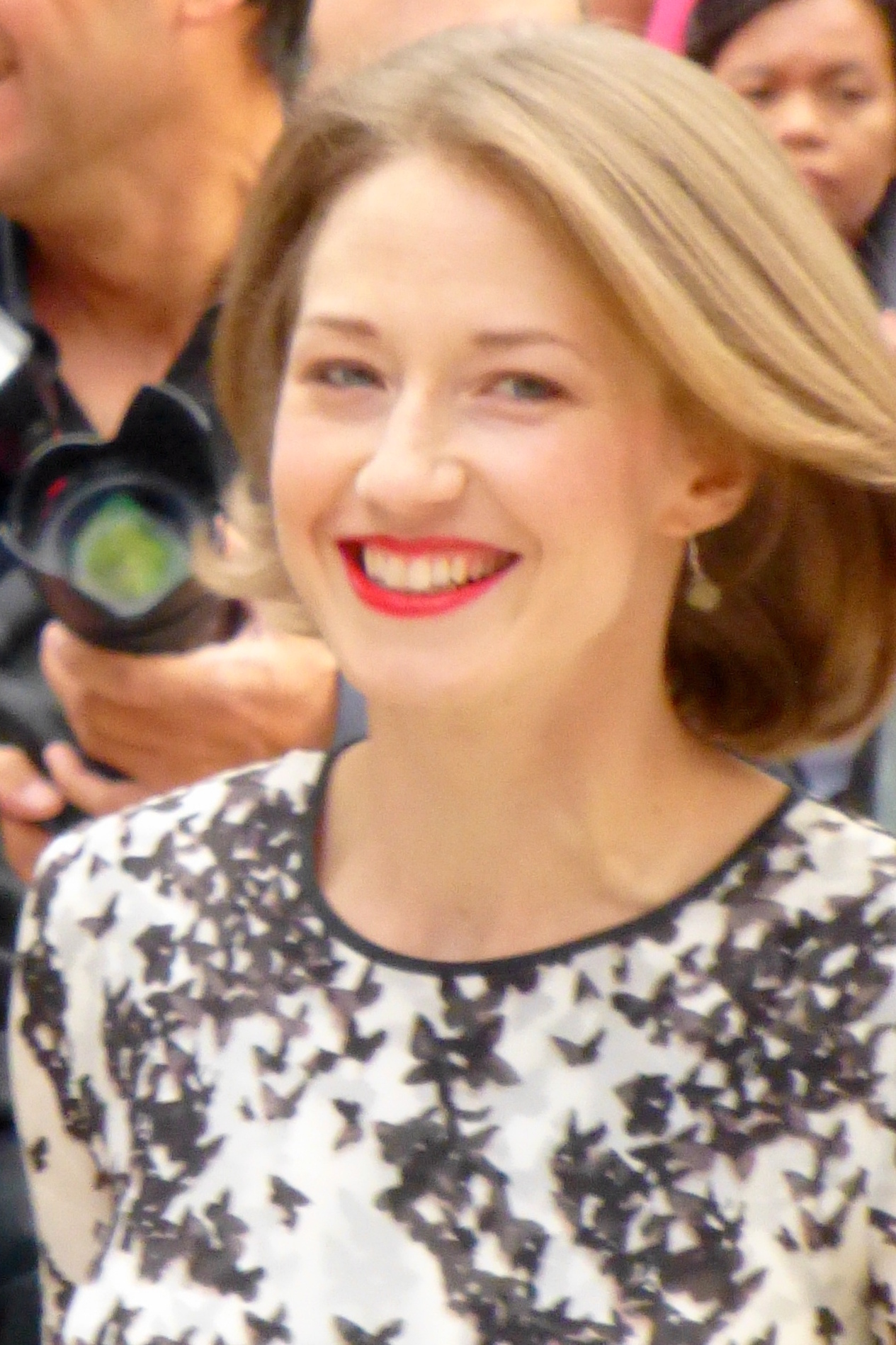
Carrie Coon's performance in the episode received widespread acclaim from critics.

"Guest" received critical acclaim. The review aggregator website Rotten Tomatoes reported a 100% approval rating with an average rating of 9.4/10 for the episode, based on 11 reviews.

Matt Fowler of IGN gave the episode an "amazing" 9.4 out of 10 and wrote in his verdict, "'Guest' was another fantastic character study. Both mysterious and cathartic, it focused almost entirely on Nora, much like Matt's episode centered on him. But 'Guest' didn't repeat the beats from 'Two Boats and a Helicopter'. It was its own beautiful mess with a surprisingly uplifting outcome. It also gave us a peak at the larger, damaged world outside of Nora's hometown - along with another indication that the larger think tank community still has no idea what the Departure was. They're actively trying to sort it out, but I think watching academics and bureaucrats debate the topic (along with conspiracy theorists) is another signal that we're not supposed to be watching this series for the 'answer'."

Sonia Saraiya of The A.V. Club gave the episode an "A" grade and wrote, "'Guest' is simply stunning. Carrie Coon's Nora Durst has long been one of the most interesting characters in The Leftovers — occupying a larger role in the season's previous highlight, 'Two Boats and a Helicopter', but otherwise existing largely on the fringes as a kind of cautionary tale. The Leftovers is demonstrably stronger when it plunges into someone's personal life and just follows them around for a few days in this post-apocalyptic landscape of loss and survival — those scenes of immersion are powerful, both recognizable and alien at the same time."

Alan Sepinwall of HitFix wrote, "'Guest' offers us our second single-POV episode of the season, and if it's not as intense or disorienting a ride as the story of Matt's big night at the casino, it's still a valuable and fascinating portrait of what life would be like for someone who lost so much in the Departure." Jeff Labrecque of Entertainment Weekly wrote, "Back home, Nora isn't stalking the mistress at the playground anymore... She saves her brother's voicemail apology. And when the doorbell rings, it's Chief Garvey, who's tracked her down to invite her to dinner. There is hope."

Kelly Braffet of Vulture gave the episode a 4 star rating out of 5 and wrote, "The Leftovers gave us another single-perspective episode, focusing on Nora Durst. This episode was less tense than Matt's - no beating of thieves to a pulp, no race-against-the-clock climax - but I still enjoyed it more than the recent ensemble episodes." Nick Harley of Den of Geek gave the episode a 3.5 star rating out of 5 and wrote, "I like certain elements and believe that it is at least partially well executed, I just don't know if it all adds up to good TV. Ambiguous loss is a terrible thing to experience, so why subject myself to that theme weekly?"

Matt Brennan of Slant Magazine wrote, "Any optimism I have on this count is mostly for Nora's sake and not my own, because both the starkness and the unexpected cheer in 'Guest' reaffirm my assessment of the series thus far: The Leftovers is great television." Michael M. Grynbaum of The New York Times wrote, "'Guest' is a revelation. It is sardonic and playful, bleak but parodic, disturbing and deeply moving. For me, it is the moment when the scattered themes and frustrated possibilities of a muddled series finally snapped into a cathartic, cohesive whole."

=== Accolades ===
TVLine named Carrie Coon as the "Performer of the Week" for the week of August 9, 2014, for her performance in the episode. The site wrote, "Already, we'd been blown away by the actress' understated, naturalistic work as Nora Durst, an object of fascination and pity around Mapleton since losing her entire family in The Sudden Departure. But in this Nora-centric episode, Coon was able to show us more — lots more — and more was even better."
