= B.J. and the A.C. =

- The Leftovers episode
- Episode no.: Season 1 Episode 4
- Directed by: Lesli Linka Glatter; Carl Franklin
- Written by: Damon Lindelof; Elizabeth Peterson
- Cinematography by: Todd McMullen
- Editing by: David Eisenberg; Colby Parker Jr.
- Production code: 4X5704
- Original air date: July 20, 2014
- Running time: 51 minutes

Episode chronology
| ← Previous "Two Boats and a Helicopter" | Next → "Gladys" |
- The Leftovers season 1

"B.J. and the A.C." is the fourth episode of the first season of the American supernatural drama television series The Leftovers, based on the novel of the same name by Tom Perrotta. The episode was written by series creator Damon Lindelof and Elizabeth Peterson, and directed by Lesli Linka Glatter and Carl Franklin. It was first broadcast on HBO in the United States on July 20, 2014.

The series is set three years after the "Sudden Departure" – an event which saw 2% of the world's population (approximately 140 million people) disappear and profoundly affected the townspeople. The characters of police chief Kevin Garvey and his family (wife Laurie, son Tom, daughter Jill and father Kevin Sr.) are focal points, alongside grieving widow Nora Durst, her brother Reverend Matt Jamison, and the mysterious cult-like organization the Guilty Remnant (GR), led by Patti Levin. In the episode, the baby Jesus doll goes missing as Mapleton approaches Christmas, with Kevin being assigned to find it. Meanwhile, Tom and Christine go on the run from authorities.

According to Nielsen Media Research, the episode was seen by an estimated 1.62 million household viewers and gained a 0.8 ratings share among adults aged 18–49. The episode received positive reviews from critics, who praised the performances and character development, although some deemed the themes of the episode as too heavy-handed.

== Plot ==
At a factory, workers build baby dolls that are packaged and sent to many locations. One of these is sent to Mapleton during Christmas, where it is placed on the local nativity display as the baby Jesus. A few days later, the baby Jesus goes missing.

Kevin (Justin Theroux) warns Patti (Ann Dowd) that the GR are not welcome at a forthcoming Christmas dance, which is a fundraiser for a new library, threatening that he will not protect them as people want to enjoy time with their families. Patti's only response is "There is no family" before leaving. Kevin instructs police officers to arrest any GR who show up at the area, also suspecting that Jill (Margaret Qualley) and Aimee (Emily Meade) were involved with the theft. Meanwhile, Tom (Chris Zylka) and Christine (Annie Q.) are staying at a hostel, with Tom frustrated that Wayne hasn't reached them out through his burner phone. A semi-naked man screaming in English and Greek about a dream tries to attack Christine until Tom hits him, forcing him to take her to a hospital.

Lucy (Amanda Warren) tells Kevin that the public wants the baby Jesus back. Instead of finding the original, she tells him to buy a new one. As he is buying it, he changes his mind and decides to find the original baby Jesus doll. He stops Adam (Max Carver) and Scott Frost (Charlie Carver), suspecting them of being involved and warning them that they should confess if they don't want trouble. That night, the twins meet with Jill, Aimee and other friends by a fire, revealing that they took the baby Jesus. Jill changes her mind about burning the doll. In the hospital, the staff suspects Tom is abusive to Christine, as he is angry that she told people of her pregnancy and connection to Wayne, forcing him to flee the hospital. He returns later and convinces her to leave with him. En route they encounter an accident with replicas of the departed intended for burial scattered on the road and covered in white sheets like in the aforementioned dream.

Kevin is visited by Meg (Liv Tyler) and Laurie (Amy Brenneman) at his house. Meg reads a note from Laurie, stating that she wants a divorce. It's also revealed to the audience that Kevin is not Tom's biological father. Kevin refuses to comply unless Laurie says it. This is witnessed by Jill, who brings a gift for Laurie as Kevin tells them to leave their house. Outside, Laurie opens the gift, which turns out to be an engraved lighter. Meg urges her to keep it and promises she won't tell, but Laurie throws it into the gutter. By the next day, Kevin finds the baby Jesus on his doorstep just as the Frost twins leave in a car. He goes to the dance with the baby Jesus, where he announces it to a confused audience.

As Kevin walks through the school hallways, he meets Nora (Carrie Coon). Nora confesses that her husband was cheating on her, while Kevin confesses he cheated on his wife. Their encounter is short but they are clearly attracted to each other. Kevin goes outside to discover GR members on the edge of the school limits. The officers decide to ignore the protocol and arrest each one of them, including Patti. During this, other GR members break into houses, stealing photos of people who departed. Laurie walks back and tries to retrieve the lighter she threw into the gutter. Kevin goes to place the baby Jesus on the nativity display, only to discover Matt (Christopher Eccleston) placing a wooden baby Jesus figure in the manger. Kevin drives off, throwing the baby Jesus near a forest.

== Production ==
=== Development ===
In June 2014, the episode's title was revealed as "B.J. and the A.C." and it was announced that series creator Damon Lindelof and Elizabeth Peterson had written the episode while Lesli Linka Glatter and Carl Franklin had directed it. This was Lindelof's fourth writing credit, Peterson's first writing credit, Glatter's first directing credit, and Franklin's first directing credit.

=== Writing ===
Originally, the episode featured more prominently the soldier whom Tom and Christine meet in the bus, which would cover around half of the episode's runtime. Lindelof considered that they made a mistake in giving the character such a big amount of time, feeling that the audience would lose interest in the series. This caused the production to be shut down for two weeks while the episode was rewritten. Due to Lesli Linka Glatter's commitment to Homeland, Carl Franklin directed the new re-filmed episode, earning a co-directing credit.

== Reception ==
=== Viewers ===
The episode was watched by 1.62 million viewers, earning a 0.8 in the 18-49 rating demographics on the Nielson ratings scale. This means that 0.8 percent of all households with televisions watched the episode. This was a 17% increase from the previous episode, which was watched by 1.38 million viewers with a 0.7 in the 18-49 demographics.

=== Critical reviews ===
"B.J. and the A.C." received generally positive reviews from critics. The review aggregator website Rotten Tomatoes reported an 82% approval rating with an average rating of 6.2/10 for the episode, based on 11 reviews. The site's consensus states: "A slight comedown from previous installments, 'B.J. and the A.C.' still contains enough engaging scenes and visual panache to compensate for its heavy-handed plotting."

Matt Fowler of IGN gave the episode a "great" 8.5 out of 10 and wrote in his verdict, "While not as potent as last week's single-character study, 'B.J. and the A.C.' opened the show up a bit more by revealing more details about Kevin and Laurie's marriage, Tom's situation, and Kevin's philandering. All while throwing a nefarious coat of 'ick' over the Guilty Remnant, as they invaded people's homes to spread their nihilism. Again, no big answers, but enough engaging moments of coincidence to make you wonder if Tom's 'holy' mission is legit."

Sonia Saraiya of The A.V. Club gave the episode a "C+" grade and wrote, "Well, tonight's episode of The Leftovers takes the idea of subtlety and tosses it out the window — along with a baby (and the bathwater, if we want to keep our idioms intact). It is not inherently a bad episode, but girl, it is very heavy-handed. I found myself cringing through a lot of it, even though there were moments that managed to speak to me."

Alan Sepinwall of HitFix wrote, "Whatever decisions and alterations happened behind the scenes, the finished product is another strong episode of The Leftovers – not as intense as last week's (or, for that matter, next week's), but an effective holiday portrait of the shattered Garvey family." Jeff Labrecque of Entertainment Weekly wrote, "Overall, I liked this episode as much as some people are going to be offended by it. It raised the stakes, established the conflict that is now inevitable, and set the course for the rest of the show. Merry Christmas."

Kelly Braffet of Vulture gave the episode a 3 star rating out of 5 and wrote, "I really want to like The Leftovers. It's not perfect, but it's generally smart, stylish without being slick, and has a hell of a cast. One thing it's not, though, is subtle." Nick Harley of Den of Geek gave the episode a 4.5 star rating out of 5 and wrote, "The Leftovers continues to improve as Lindelof continues to go against his instincts and just let us know things. The show also is utilizing its smaller moments to maximum benefit. Slowly but surely, The Leftovers is becoming appointment television. Let the internet thinkpieces flow."

Matt Brennan of Slant Magazine wrote, "In 'B.J.', The Leftovers finds its firmest footing yet, by dint of the episode's powerful suggestion that 'religion' is just a minefield of ghosts." Michael M. Grynbaum of The New York Times wrote, "There's a clunkiness here that undercuts the visual smarts — why, for instance, the bluesy soul song played over the doll-making sequence? Sure, it's a jarring aural-visual contrast, but it felt manipulative and a bit smug, as if the show is too enamored of its own capacity to disturb."
