= Penguin One, Us Zero =

- The Leftovers episode
- Episode no.: Season 1 Episode 2
- Directed by: Peter Berg
- Written by: Damon Lindelof; Kath Lingenfelter
- Cinematography by: Todd McMullen
- Editing by: Hank Van Eeghen
- Production code: 4X5702
- Original air date: July 6, 2014
- Running time: 56 minutes

Guest appearances
- Scott Glenn as Kevin Garvey, Sr.; Paterson Joseph as Holy Wayne; David Turner as Anthony; Victor Williams as Ron Jensen

Episode chronology
← Previous "Pilot"	Next → "Two Boats and a Helicopter"
- The Leftovers season 1

"Penguin One, Us Zero" is the second episode of the first season of the American supernatural drama television series The Leftovers, based on the novel of the same name by Tom Perrotta. The episode was written by series creator Damon Lindelof and supervising producer Kath Lingenfelter, and directed by executive producer Peter Berg. It was first broadcast on HBO in the United States on July 6, 2014.

The series is set three years after the "Sudden Departure" – an event which saw 2% of the world's population (approximately 140 million people) disappear and profoundly affected the townspeople. The characters of police chief Kevin Garvey and his family (wife Laurie, son Tom, daughter Jill and father Kevin Sr.) are focal points, alongside grieving widow Nora Durst, her brother Reverend Matt Jamison, and the mysterious cult-like organization the Guilty Remnant (GR), led by Patti Levin. In the episode, Kevin questions his sanity as he starts dreaming about Dean, while Meg joins the Guilty Remnant, trying to understand what she wants.

According to Nielsen Media Research, the episode was seen by an estimated 1.55 million household viewers and gained a 0.7 ratings share among adults aged 18–49. The episode received positive reviews from critics, who praised the performances (particularly Liv Tyler), lingering questions and directing, although some expressed criticism for its pacing.

== Plot ==
Two Bureau of Alcohol, Tobacco, Firearms, Explosives, and Cults (ATFEC) agents investigate Holy Wayne (Paterson Joseph), deeming him a threat to the country based on his profile, with possible indication of sex offenses. An ATFEC team raids Wayne's compound, killing many of its members. Just as an agent prepares to execute Christine (Annie Q.), Tom (Chris Zylka) kills the agent and takes her to an underground hideout.

Kevin (Justin Theroux) is haunted by a dream where he sees Dean (Michael Gaston). He is also reprimanded by Lucy (Amanda Warren), as some civilians saw him shooting dogs the previous night. Kevin dismisses it, but is confused when a bagel he placed on a toaster disappears. Later, he finds that Dean's truck has been parked in his driveway, with a dead dog on the trunk. While at a coffee shop, Jill (Margaret Qualley) and Aimee (Emily Meade) notice Nora (Carrie Coon) carrying a gun in a bag, before intentionally spilling her cup, breaking it. As they follow her, they see her hugging Reverend Matt (Christopher Eccleston). They follow her in a car, eventually deducing that she is Matt's sister.

Tom and Christine escape to a gas station, where they are reunited with Wayne. Wayne congratulates Tom for protecting Christine, although the murder he committed may have "poisoned" him. He offers to hug him to hug his "pain" away, which Tom declines. Wayne decides to go on the run, telling Tom to protect the pregnant Christine and to go off the grid. At the Guilty Remnant's pledge house, Laurie (Amy Brenneman) has been assigned as a mentor to Meg (Liv Tyler). They make Meg chop a tree with an axe. This frustrates Meg, as she feels there is no purpose in this. Her fiancé issues a missing report on her, prompting Kevin to visit her. Meg claims that she wants to stay with Guilty Remnant, although she still keeps his contact card. Later, seeing the sacrifices that Laurie made, she surrenders her departed mother's sweater.

At night, Kevin is visited by Dean, who claims that they could go shooting dogs the next day, also telling Kevin to keep his truck. The next day, Kevin visits his father, Kevin Sr. (Scott Glenn), who has been committed to an institution. Kevin is questioning his sanity, but his father states he can't help him. He goes back to the station where he opens the toaster, discovering the burned bagel inside. Back at the Guilty Remnant, Meg finally decides to stay, emotionally chopping the tree.

== Production ==
=== Development ===
In June 2014, the episode's title was revealed as "Penguin One, Us Zero" and it was announced that series creator Damon Lindelof and supervising producer Kath Lingenfelter had written the episode while executive producer Peter Berg had directed it. This was Lindelof's second writing credit, Lingenfelter's first writing credit, and Berg's second directing credit.

=== Writing ===
According to co-writer Kath Lingenfelter, the bagel scene was inspired by an experience by series creator Damon Lindelof, who claimed that his bagel disappeared while writing the series.

== Reception ==
=== Viewers ===
The episode was watched by 1.55 million viewers, earning a 0.7 in the 18-49 rating demographics on the Nielson ratings scale. This means that 0.7 percent of all households with televisions watched the episode. This was a 13% decrease from the previous episode, which was watched by 1.77 million viewers with a 0.8 in the 18-49 demographics.

=== Critical reviews ===
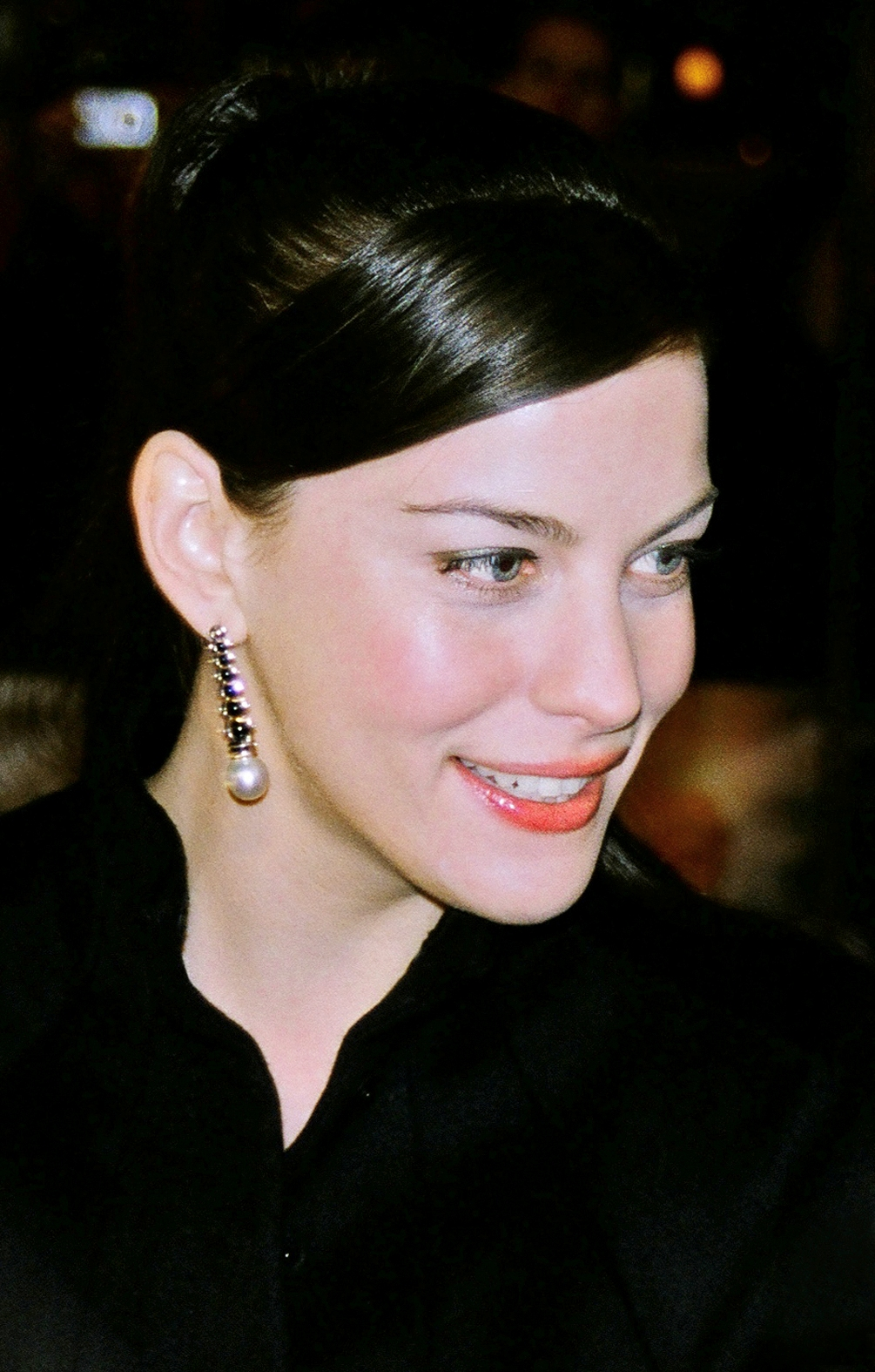
Liv Tyler's performance in the episode received praise from critics.

"Penguin One, Us Zero" received positive reviews from critics. The review aggregator website Rotten Tomatoes reported a 100% approval rating with an average rating of 7.9/10 for the episode, based on 12 reviews.

Matt Fowler of IGN gave the episode a "great" 8.3 out of 10 and wrote in his verdict, "The Leftovers continued to focus on the crumbling mind and spirit this week on and episode that dealt with madness permeating into many levels of society. This show carries with it an addictive angst that's difficult for those like me who are drawn to stories about broken people to resist. Everyone's cracked and creased, but in different ways and for different reasons. The Guilty Remnants, by default, come off as the 'enemy' since they seem to serve the parasitic purpose of 'never fixing oneself.'"

Sonia Saraiya of The A.V. Club gave the episode an "A–" grade and wrote, "It's beginning to make more sense why the pilot of The Leftovers looked the way it did: 'Penguin One, Us Zero' is a perplexingly titled hour, but it's more satisfying than the show's first episode. In part that's because it's taking the scattered, meandering threads of the pilot and pulling them taut — it's wasted no time in bringing some characters to a position of reckoning, forcing them to make choices that are defining and eventful."

Alan Sepinwall of HitFix wrote, "One of the most fascinating things to me about The Leftovers is the way that the story is focused on the Garvey family, who lost no one we know about in the Departure, but who have all lost themselves and each other in the aftermath. And while 'Penguin One, Us Zero' starts to open a window on what life is like for someone like Nora Durst, whose whole family vanished, its main focus is on examining how people like the Garveys and Meg Abbott have unspooled themselves from all the existential weight of a world where something like the Departure can happen." Jeff Labrecque of Entertainment Weekly wrote, "It's too early to push away The Leftovers, but the second episode did closely echo the premiere in particular ways, with the payoff being a surprising link between characters. In the premiere, Laurie's relationship to the Garveys was only revealed near the end, and the second episode relied on Lucy and the crazy ex-chief's relationship to provide some oomph. It's a trick that gets less impressive each time — and, in theory, it shouldn't be necessary after the first few episodes — but future installments will need to focus more on the present and future instead of dwelling on the past."

Kelly Braffet of Vulture gave the episode a 3 star rating out of 5 and wrote, "What we gained in explanation, we lost in momentum. I'm still enthusiastic about the characters and the premise, but more things need to happen now." Nick Harley of Den of Geek gave the episode a 3.5 star rating out of 5 and wrote, "The Leftovers continues to move forward without pouring on exposition too thick. The show lets audiences get acquainted with the program's world on their own, which can be fun for audiences that like to be challenged by art and frustrating for those who want things spelled out for them. No matter what camp you're in, there's no denying the fact that The Leftovers leaves you curious and wondering, but you have to wonder when patience will run out."

Matt Brennan of Slant Magazine wrote, "Stripped of the superegos that maintained the old world now gone, the residents of Mapleton revert to the id of animal instinct. Deep down, perhaps, we're all just feral dogs waiting to be unleashed." Michael M. Grynbaum of The New York Times wrote, "After two lugubrious episodes of The Leftovers, we've seen two endings featuring the exact same scenario: a tortured character finds solace in a spontaneous act of violence. Garvey exorcised his frustrations in the premiere by unloading a few rounds into a wild pack of dogs. (Who hasn't?)"

=== Accolades ===
TVLine named Liv Tyler as an honorable mention as the "Performer of the Week" for the week of July 12, 2014, for her performance in the episode. The site wrote, "HBO's The Leftovers has a tendency to put us through a gamut of emotions, and Liv Tyler encapsulated each one of them in her portrayal of Meg Abbott in this week's episode. In just a handful of scenes, Tyler infused in her desperate character confusion, exasperation, sadness and a few fleeting seconds of hope. And considering The Leftovers' basic premise is one that we can't fathom happening in real life, Tyler's ability to make Meg relatable deserves the highest praise. As she turned to Amy Brenneman's Laurie and said, simply, 'I don't want to feel this way anymore,' we felt deep compassion for a character we'd only just met."
