= The Garveys at Their Best =

- The Leftovers episode
- Episode no.: Season 1 Episode 9
- Directed by: Daniel Sackheim
- Written by: Kath Lingenfelter; Damon Lindelof
- Cinematography by: Todd McMullen
- Editing by: David Eisenberg
- Production code: 4X5709
- Original air date: August 24, 2014
- Running time: 56 minutes

Guest appearances
- Scott Glenn as Kevin Garvey, Sr.; Marceline Hugot as Gladys; Janel Moloney as Mary Jamison; Wayne Duvall as Detective Louis Vitello; Sebastian Arcelus as Doug Durst; Scott William Winters as Michael

Episode chronology
← Previous "Cairo"	Next → "The Prodigal Son Returns"
- The Leftovers season 1

"The Garveys at Their Best" is the ninth episode of the first season of the American supernatural drama television series The Leftovers, based on the novel of the same name by Tom Perrotta. The episode was written by supervising producer Kath Lingenfelter and series creator Damon Lindelof, and directed by Daniel Sackheim. It was first broadcast on HBO in the United States on August 24, 2014.

The series is set three years after the "Sudden Departure" – an event which saw 2% of the world's population (approximately 140 million people) disappear and profoundly affected the townspeople. The characters of police chief Kevin Garvey and his family (wife Laurie, son Tom, daughter Jill and father Kevin Sr.) are focal points, alongside grieving widow Nora Durst, her brother Reverend Matt Jamison, and the mysterious cult-like organization the Guilty Remnant (GR), led by Patti Levin. The episode depicts the lives of the characters before the Departure as well as their reactions to the event.

According to Nielsen Media Research, the episode was seen by an estimated 1.85 million household viewers and gained a 0.9 ratings share among adults aged 18–49, making it the most watched episode of the series. The episode received critical acclaim, with critics praising the writing, character development, performances, emotional tone and revelations.

== Plot ==
Kevin (Justin Theroux) returns to his house after jogging, which looks different than in previous episodes. He is welcomed by Laurie (Amy Brenneman), revealing that the events are taking place before the Departure. Laurie is preparing for an appointment at her job as a psychiatrist, while Jill (Margaret Qualley) is shown to be more free-spirited and innocent. Kevin wants them to prepare for a birthday party that night.

Laurie tends to a recurring patient, who turns out to be Patti (Ann Dowd). Patti feels a looming sense of dread and suggests that the world could end. Laurie considers that Patti may be the victim of spousal abuse, advising that she can calm herself by placing all her fears in a bag and leave them at her husband's doorstep. Laurie later goes to pick up a dog, with Gladys (Marceline Hugot) as the breeder, although Laurie does not want to make a decision until she discusses it with Kevin. Meanwhile, Nora (Carrie Coon) prepares for a job interview, informing her husband Doug (Sebastian Arcelus) and her children. Her interview proves to be part of the electoral campaign for Lucy (Amanda Warren), who is a city councilwoman. Their interview is interrupted by Kevin Sr. (Scott Glenn), who works as Chief of Police, inviting Lucy to his birthday party, aware that Kevin is planning it.

Kevin is alerted when a deer attacks in an elementary school. Kevin Sr. wants to order officers to kill the deer, but Kevin suggests it might not be the best. Kevin Sr. gives him the chance to calm the deer and return it to the woods before animal control takes care of it. Kevin is also called when Tom (Chris Zylka) is arrested for confronting his biological father, Michael (Scott William Winters). Kevin releases Tom and then punches Michael in front of his young kid. He takes him home, where he bonds with Jill. Laurie also tells Jill that she will be unable to attend her science fair for an appointment, although Jill claims she understands.

That night, Kevin Sr. is welcomed to his "surprise" party. The party is attended by many police colleagues and friends, including Matt (Christopher Eccleston) and his wife Mary (Janel Moloney), who still walks. After Kevin delivers a toast, his father tells him that he lacks a greater purpose and needs to stop pretending some aspects of his life. Before sleeping, Kevin reaffirms to Laurie that he is interested in getting a dog.

On October 14, Kevin once again goes jogging. He witnesses a manhole cover exploding without explanation, prompting him to return home. When he tells Laurie about it, she dismisses it as she confronts him about smoking and the fight with Michael, with Kevin expressing unhappiness with his life. Alerted of the deer's presence, Kevin follows it to a house owned by a family. The deer flees the house and is hit by a car as it exits the house. With the deer wounded, Kevin puts it out of its misery by shooting it. He takes the woman who drove the car to her hotel room, where he has sex with her. Laurie arrives at a clinic, where she runs into Mary, who is waiting for Matt to come out from a scanning session. Matt comes out, revealing that there is nothing wrong with him. Laurie enters the clinic room for an ultrasound, revealing that she is pregnant.

At the moment of the Departure, Nora is unable to answer a phone call from Lucy after her daughter spills juice on her phone. As she takes her frustration out on her family they all vanish. Tom and Jill are part of a human circuit at the science fair, and realise that one of Jill's classmates has disappeared when the light they are powering goes out. The woman Kevin is having an affair with vanishes while they are having sex, and after being distracted by a scream Laurie realises her child no longer appears on the ultrasound scan.

== Production ==
=== Development ===
In July 2014, the episode's title was revealed as "The Garveys at Their Best" and it was announced that supervising producer Kath Lingenfelter and series creator Damon Lindelof had written the episode while Daniel Sackheim had directed it. This was Lingenfelter's third writing credit, Lindelof's eighth writing credit, and Sackheim's first directing credit.

== Reception ==
=== Viewers ===
The episode was watched by 1.85 million viewers, earning a 0.9 in the 18-49 rating demographics on the Nielson ratings scale. This means that 0.9 percent of all households with televisions watched the episode. This was a 12% increase from the previous episode, which was watched by 1.64 million viewers with a 0.8 in the 18-49 demographics.

=== Critical reviews ===
"The Garveys at Their Best" received critical acclaim. The review aggregator website Rotten Tomatoes reported a 100% approval rating with an average rating of 9.6/10 for the episode, based on 11 reviews. The site's consensus states: "A solid standalone episode in its own right, 'The Garveys at Their Best' effectively sets the stage for an exciting season finale."

Matt Fowler of IGN gave the episode an "amazing" 9.2 out of 10 and wrote, "The Leftovers took a wise leap backward this week. Initially, when I read the title of the episode, 'The Garveys at Their Best', I assumed it was ironic, as our headlining family is at anything but their best these days. But it was actually meant seriously, in a sort of half-earnest sense."

Sonia Saraiya of The A.V. Club gave the episode an "A–" grade and wrote, "The Leftovers does not always manage to convince the viewer that the creators know exactly what they're doing. 'The Garveys At Their Best' is in fact a fantastic episode, on its own. But it leads to one very obvious question: Why on earth didn't we see this three, six, or even nine weeks ago? It's been a season of weird hiccups and pauses, punctuated with a lot of questions about who these characters are and why their stories are important. Tonight's episode offers a lot of helpful information in that vein. So what was the point of making us wait to see the backstories of these characters, nine weeks after the pilot, instead of making this, or some version of this, into the pilot?"

Alan Sepinwall of HitFix wrote, "Great episode, and another example of how well the show excels when it deviates from whatever formula it's established for itself within these first 9 hours of television." Kyle Ryan of Entertainment Weekly wrote, "While the press around The Leftovers has reiterated that explanations will be in short supply, 'Cairo' and 'The Garveys at Their Best' have connected a lot of dots. The slow build of the series to this point has picked up speed, nicely setting up what looks to be an engrossing season finale."

Kelly Braffet of Vulture gave the episode a perfect 5 star rating out of 5 and wrote, "Many a time, I've accused this show of holding back, but this episode was a great big gift wrapped in sadness. This is the episode we've been waiting for." Nick Harley of Den of Geek gave the episode a 3 star rating out of 5 and wrote, "I have no idea where The Leftovers will leave viewers before departing for the year. With season two already a lock, the show will need to hook us hard to get us to want to come back, and right now, I don't know what big revelations could make that happen. Once again, I feel myself saying that this episode wasn't bad, it just wasn't exactly useful storytelling. Don't bore me with where we've already been, boldly take me somewhere new."

Matt Brennan of Slant Magazine wrote that the episode is "principally, a reconsideration of characters we believe we've come to know, and the hour's string of surprises nimbly steers between continuity and change." Michael M. Grynbaum of The New York Times wrote, "Sunday's episode, as difficult as it was to watch, also struck me as our best insight yet into the inner lives of characters who have been frustratingly opaque for an entire season."
