= Cairo (The Leftovers) =

- The Leftovers episode
- Episode no.: Season 1 Episode 8
- Directed by: Michelle MacLaren
- Written by: Curtis Gwinn; Carlito Rodriguez
- Cinematography by: Michael Grady
- Editing by: Henk Van Eeghen
- Production code: 4X5708
- Original air date: August 17, 2014
- Running time: 56 minutes

Guest appearance
- Janel Moloney as Mary Jamison

Episode chronology
← Previous "Solace for Tired Feet"	Next → "The Garveys at Their Best"
- The Leftovers season 1

"Cairo" is the eighth episode of the first season of the American supernatural drama television series The Leftovers, based on the novel of the same name by Tom Perrotta. The episode was written by supervising producer Curtis Gwinn and Carlito Rodriguez, and directed by Michelle MacLaren. It was first broadcast on HBO in the United States on August 17, 2014.

The series is set three years after the "Sudden Departure" – an event which saw 2% of the world's population (approximately 140 million people) disappear and profoundly affected the townspeople. The characters of police chief Kevin Garvey and his family (wife Laurie, son Tom, daughter Jill and father Kevin Sr.) are focal points, alongside grieving widow Nora Durst, her brother Reverend Matt Jamison, and the mysterious cult-like organization the Guilty Remnant (GR), led by Patti Levin. In the episode, Kevin finds himself in the woods with Dean, with no clue to how he got there. He discovers to his shock that he attacked and kidnapped Patti, keeping her in a cabin.

According to Nielsen Media Research, the episode was seen by an estimated 1.64 million household viewers and gained a 0.8 ratings share among adults aged 18–49. The episode received extremely positive reviews from critics, who praised the performances (particularly Justin Theroux and Ann Dowd), character development, pacing and ending.

== Plot ==
Kevin (Justin Theroux) invites Nora (Carrie Coon) to dine with him, Jill (Margaret Qualley) and Aimee (Emily Meade) at their house. As Nora explains her job at the Department of the Sudden Departure (DSD), Jill questions her about a gun she carries in her purse. Nora claims she got rid of the gun and allows Jill to check her purse, proving she doesn't carry it anymore. That night, Kevin goes to sleep and by the next morning, he finds himself in his car, without memory of how he got there. Dean (Michael Gaston) appears and takes him to a cabin in the woods, where Kevin finds Patti (Ann Dowd) unconscious and tied to a chair.

Dean claims that it was Kevin's idea to abduct her after he brutally attacked her, also revealing that they are in Cairo, New York, horrifying Kevin. As she awakens, Kevin tells her they could forget about the incident, only to be spat on by Patti, speaking to him for the first time to tell him she does not forget. She threatens to go to the authorities, which will cost Kevin his job and Jill. Back at Mapleton, Laurie (Amy Brenneman) leads the GR after Patti's absence, apologizing to Matt (Christopher Eccleston) for a previous incident. Jill and Aimee get into a fight over the dinner scene, with Jill questioning if Aimee slept with Kevin. Aimee claims to have done it and angrily leaves her. Jill and Adam (Max Carver) and Scott Frost (Charlie Carver) search Nora's house to find the gun, discovering it along with her bulletproof vest. Later, Aimee decides to move out of the Garvey house.

Back in the cabin, Dean confronts Kevin for his sudden change in behavior, as he lacks the courage he displayed the previous night. As he goes outside to call Nora, Kevin finds his police uniforms scattered throughout the woods. He returns to the cabin, discovering that Dean is slowly killing Patti by placing a bag over her head. Kevin and Dean fight over the decision, which culminates when Kevin removes the bag, saving her. Fed up, Dean decides to leave Kevin all by himself, also indicating that he met him many times before. In Mapleton, Laurie receives a shipment of Departure replicas at their church, and has the members dress them per Patti's orders. That night, Laurie is surprised to find Jill, who has asked to stay.

Despite saving her life, Patti claims her position with Kevin has not changed. She explains that the GR wants to remind everyone of what everyone wants to forget. She also confirms that Gladys' death was orchestrated by her, with Gladys agreeing to her own death, claiming that something is coming. Kevin deduces that she wants him to kill her, but he refuses, claiming that he will accept the responsibility of his actions, freeing her. However, Patti takes a shard of glass and slits her throat, dying in Kevin's arms.

== Production ==
=== Development ===
In July 2014, the episode's title was revealed as "Cairo" and it was announced that supervising producer Curtis Gwinn and Carlito Rodriguez had written the episode while Michelle MacLaren had directed it. This was Gwinn's first writing credit, Rodriguez's first writing credit, and MacLaren's first directing credit.

== Reception ==
=== Viewers ===
The episode was watched by 1.64 million viewers, earning a 0.8 in the 18-49 rating demographics on the Nielson ratings scale. This means that 0.8 percent of all households with televisions watched the episode. This was a slight increase from the previous episode, which was watched by 1.58 million viewers with a 0.8 in the 18-49 demographics.

=== Critical reviews ===
"Cairo" received extremely positive reviews from critics. The review aggregator website Rotten Tomatoes reported a 100% approval rating with an average rating of 9.2/10 for the episode, based on 11 reviews.

Matt Fowler of IGN gave the episode a "great" 8.8 out of 10 and wrote in his verdict, "The Leftovers dropped a wicked and heavy weight on our laps this week with 'Cairo' - where Kevin's sanity and morality were run through a rather diabolical gauntlet. I wasn't immensely satisfied with the reveal of Gladys' true killer, but I was very excited to see some big reveals as far as Kevin's blackouts were concerned. As that's the type of story that shouldn't linger too long on TV, lest viewers jump out ahead of it. Director Michelle MacLaren, along with writers Curtis Gwinn and Carlito Rodriguez, did an expert job with this twisted funhouse mirror episode. If Kevin and Nora's budding relationship was the calm before the storm, then this was the first lightning flash and thunderclap."

Sonia Saraiya of The A.V. Club gave the episode a "B+" grade and wrote, "My guess is that The Leftovers' aim is more about bringing together fantastic ideas than bringing together a fantastic story — because the subtext is way more interesting (and comprehensible) than the basic plot of the text. More than most weeks, 'Cairo' has some compelling underpinnings that make it a solid episode. But especially around Kevin, the storytelling falls short of the mystery."

Alan Sepinwall of HitFix wrote, "Whether as a ticking-clock thriller or as an exploration of what motivates the series' chief villains, 'Cairo' was just dynamite, and evidence that The Leftovers doesn't have to resort to a strict single-POV angle every week if it wants to achieve its full dramatic potential." Jeff Labrecque of Entertainment Weekly wrote, "After seven careful to the point of being tedious Leftovers episodes alienated some of the show's audience for a stubborn dearth of answers, 'Cairo' was an avalanche of information."

Kelly Braffet of Vulture gave the episode a perfect 5 star rating out of 5 and wrote, "What does it mean that the Chief, our Everyman, is working what might be the most nihilistic angle in the show, and working it so secretly that even he doesn't know what's going on? And where the hell is the guy going to go from here?" Nick Harley of Den of Geek gave the episode a 4 star rating out of 5 and wrote, "Overall, this episode seemed to really dial things up and also added some clarity to things we've already seen. The show's self-serious tone still takes some getting adjusted to, but I like that it seems like we're going somewhere, and the GR's upcoming plans will push things even further. I'm still not as in love with this show as I should be for something that I view every week, but this is a good step in the right direction."

Matt Brennan of Slant Magazine wrote that the episode "begins with a song, climaxes with a poem, and concludes with a whisper, but it's what each of these leaves unspoken that captures the testy relationship between faith and doubt at the heart of The Leftovers." Michael M. Grynbaum of The New York Times wrote, "All that is to say that 'Cairo', the eighth installment of this debut Leftovers season, was a busy, twisty hour, packed with more plot surprises than the first few episodes combined. Many viewers will feel relief but also a deep dread, because clearly something very, very dark is coming."

=== Accolades ===
TVLine named Ann Dowd as an honorable mention as the "Performer of the Week" for the week of August 23, 2014, for her performance in the episode. The site wrote, "Throughout this first season of The Leftovers, Ann Dowd's work as Mapleton's Guilty Remnant ringleader, Patti, has left us as speechless as the character usually is. No matter if the cult leader's just been staring daggers or breaking her vow of silence to utter apocalyptic BS with absolute conviction, her portrayer has made her pathetic, infuriating and scary as hell. And, in her final episode, 'Cairo', the actress really went for broke, throwing herself into Patti's poetic last monologue so wholeheartedly that it was impossible to say whether we were witnessing true faith or real madness (or both!). In either case, we sure witnessed one amazing swan song."
