= Offramp (disambiguation) =

An offramp is an exit ramp on an interchange road.

Offramp, Off Ramp, etc., may also refer to:

- Offramp (album), a 1982 album by Pat Metheny Group
- Off-Ramp, a DC Comics superhero character
- "Off Ramp", a 2015 episode of The Leftovers
- Off ramp (diplomacy), peaceful compromise offered as an exit strategy
