= Pilot (The Leftovers) =

- The Leftovers episode
- Episode no.: Season 1 Episode 1
- Directed by: Peter Berg
- Written by: Damon Lindelof; Tom Perrotta
- Cinematography by: Michael Slovis
- Production code: 276070
- Original air date: June 29, 2014
- Running time: 72 minutes

Guest appearances
- Brad Leland as Congressman Witten; Paterson Joseph as Holy Wayne

Episode chronology
← Previous —	Next → "Penguin One, Us Zero"
- The Leftovers season 1

"Pilot" is the series premiere of the HBO drama television series The Leftovers. It aired in the United States on June 29, 2014. The series is based on Tom Perrotta's novel of the same name. It received mostly positive reviews, with critics praising its themes and the performances of the cast.

== Plot ==
=== October 14 ===
A young mother (Natalie Gold) is at the laundromat with her baby, Sam, who won't stop crying. After putting Sam in the backseat, she ends a phone call and finds that Sam has disappeared. As she searches for him she sees a little boy calling out for his father, who has also vanished. The parking lot and surrounding area erupt in mayhem, and several juxtaposed 911 calls are placed reporting the disappearance of numerous people.

=== Three years later ===
Kevin Garvey (Justin Theroux), the police chief in the town of Mapleton, New York, witnesses Dean (Michael Gaston) shoot and kill a dog and flee in a truck during his morning run. After attempting to return the dog's remains to its owner, he rushes to a meeting with the mayor, Lucy Warburton (Amanda Warren), to the annual Heroes Day parade to remember those who vanished during the "Sudden Departure." Though the mayor is confident that it will be an uneventful gathering of grieving people, Kevin warns that the local chapter of a cult known as the Guilty Remnant, who have grown to the point where they own several houses on a cul-de-sac in town, will protest the event, and leaves when his request to cancel the parade is denied.

At a Guilty Remnant house, Laurie (Amy Brenneman) wakes amongst her fellow Remnants, and is angered when she is left out of the group's planned protest during the parade. As the Remnants do not speak, she writes her grievance to the group's leader, Patti (Ann Dowd), who allows her to join in.

At school, Kevin's daughter, Jill (Margaret Qualley) chooses not to participate in prayer. After breaking another girl's nose during field hockey practice, she is invited to a party by her friend, Aimee (Emily Meade). She gets permission from Kevin over dinner, and leaves for the party, but departs soon after a game in which Aimee and Jill's crush, Nick, have sex. While helping Adam (Max Carver) and Scott Frost (Charlie Carver) look for car keys, she finds the dead dog her father picked up inside the trunk of her car. With the help of the twins, she buries the dog.

Meanwhile, on the west coast of the United States, Kevin's son Tom (Chris Zylka) drives a blindfolded Congressman Witten (Brad Leland) to a compound outside of town belonging to another cult. Upon their arrival, the Congressman is taken to meet the cult's leader, known as Holy Wayne (Paterson Joseph), while Tom chats with cult member Christine (Annie Q.). Once the Congressman is ready to leave, Tom is asked to stay the night, as Wayne wants to speak with him. Wayne comes to Tom at night and tells him that Christine is important, and Tom needs to protect her from impending danger.

At dinner with her fiancé, Meg (Liv Tyler) continues to be harassed by Guilty Remnant members, including Laurie, for unknown reasons. When the couple head home, she finds the same Remnants standing outside her home, and slaps Laurie before heading inside in tears. The following day, Kevin arrives late to the parade and marches with the rest of the town. The mayor unveils a statue in tribute to the victims of the Sudden Departure, and invites Nora Durst (Carrie Coon), a woman who lost her husband and two children in the event, to speak. As she finishes, the Guilty Remnants arrive holding letter signs to spell "stop wasting your breath". The assembled townspeople take offense and attack them, while Kevin and his officers struggle to contain the violence.

That night, after getting drunk, Kevin arrives at the Guilty Remnants cul-de-sac and demands to speak with Laurie, who is revealed to be his wife. He begs her to come home but she refuses to speak with him, and he is thrown off the property. Shortly afterward, Meg arrives in a taxi and asks Patti if she can stay with their group for a few days, and Patti has Laurie take her inside. Kevin stops driving when he sees a deer standing in the middle of the road. As he exits his car to approach the deer, it is chased down, killed, and eaten by a pack of dogs. Dean, arriving soon after, tells Kevin that "they are not our dogs anymore," and the pair shoot at the pack.

== Production ==
"Pilot" was written by series creators Damon Lindelof and Tom Perrotta and directed by Peter Berg, who appears in a cameo role as Pete. The budget for the pilot episode was $8,433,643.

In an interview with Tom Perrotta featured on the Season 1 Blu-ray, Lindelof explained that much of the show was informed by the decisions that were made while shooting the pilot, saying, "that's the most exciting thing, I think, about television. There's an improvisational quality to it. You know, we're shooting the pilot and basically there's nothing behind it yet, so, so much of that process of writing episodes two through ten was informed by the experience that we had while shooting the pilot."

In a 2015 interview with Uproxx, Damon Lindelof explained that before shooting the pilot episode, director Peter Berg told Lindelof that the script made him think about Newtown after the Sandy Hook shooting. He recalled Berg saying: "I read this and I just remember the news that day and what it was like to be completely and totally blindsided and how I related it to my own child, and how some act of completely and totally inexplicably devastating violence breaks the rules because, you know, people are going to get shot in war zones but that"s never supposed to happen. And I just keep thinking about Sandy Hook." Lindelof goes on to explain that while preparing to shoot the pilot, Berg took him to Newtown, and that "the entire town felt just really sad and tragic, and there were ribbons everywhere, and they had built this amazing lighthouse monument that was covered in messages . . . all those things just became embedded in the show at that point."

== Reception ==
=== Ratings ===
The pilot episode received 1.77 million viewers when it premiered, and achieved a 0.8 rating in the 18-49 demographic.

=== Critical reception ===
The pilot episode received largely positive reviews, with praise for the series' themes, performances, and intrigue. On Rotten Tomatoes, it gained an approval rating of 100%, based on 13 reviews, with an average rating of 9.00 out of 10. The A.V. Club gave the episode a B+. Alan Sepinwall of Uproxx said of the Garvey family: "What I've always found interesting about the story is that it focuses on the Garvey family, who lost absolutely no one close to them in the Departure, but who have all lost each other as a result" and stated "I don't know how many of you are going to have the patience for this going forward, but I'm all in." Ben Travers of IndieWire gave the episode an "A" grade. Robert Ham of Paste wrote of the pilot: "It is doing what a pilot episode is supposed to do, though: setting up the central themes and characters and leaving you hanging just enough to encourage you to come back for more."

=== Accolades ===
For the 67th Writers Guild of America Awards, the pilot episode was nominated for Best Long Form Adapted, but lost to Olive Kitteridge, a fellow HBO series.
