= List of The Leftovers episodes =

American supernatural mystery television series episode list

The Leftovers is an American supernatural mystery drama television series created and produced by Damon Lindelof and Tom Perrotta, based on Perrotta's novel of the same name. It premiered on HBO on June 29, 2014, and ran for three seasons, ending on June 4, 2017. The series features an ensemble cast that includes Justin Theroux, Amy Brenneman, Christopher Eccleston, Liv Tyler, Chris Zylka, Margaret Qualley, Carrie Coon, Ann Dowd, Regina King, Kevin Carroll and Jovan Adepo.

The series takes place in a variety of locations, including New York (seasons 1–2), Texas (seasons 2–3) and Victoria, Australia (season 3). It begins three years after the "Sudden Departure", a global event that resulted in 2% of the world's population disappearing, and follows the lives of those who were left behind.

During the course of the series, 28 episodes of The Leftovers aired over three seasons.

== Series overview ==
Season	Episodes	Originally released	
Season	Episodes	First released	Last released
1	10	June 29, 2014	September 7, 2014
2	10	October 4, 2015	December 6, 2015
3	8	April 16, 2017	June 4, 2017

== Episodes ==
=== Season 1 (2014) ===
The first season consists of ten episodes and aired from June 29 to September 7, 2014. It takes place primarily in the small town of Mapleton, New York, three years after the "Sudden Departure" – an event which saw 2% of the world's population (approximately 140 million people) disappear and profoundly affected the townspeople. The characters of police chief Kevin Garvey and his family (wife Laurie, son Tom, daughter Jill and father Kevin Sr.) are focal points of the season, alongside grieving widow Nora Durst, her brother Reverend Matt Jamison, and the mysterious cult-like organization the Guilty Remnant (GR), led by Patti Levin.

The first season follows multiple storylines, notably the fallout from the Departure and the subsequent grief, anger and fear the townspeople share with the rest of the world. The season also focuses on Kevin's failing attempts to maintain order in the town and to keep his family together, the GR's increasingly nefarious schemes and the townspeople's sentiment against them, Matt's crisis of faith, and Nora's attempts to move on and conceal the pain she has been harboring since the Departure.

The first episode has no opening credits, while the opening theme for the other nine episodes is "The Leftovers (Main Title Theme)" by series composer Max Richter.

No. overall	No. in season	Title	Directed by	Written by	Original release date	Prod. code	U.S. viewers (millions)
1	1	"Pilot"	Peter Berg	Damon Lindelof & Tom Perrotta	June 29, 2014	276070	1.767
On October 14, 2011, 2% of the world's population disappears. Three years later in Mapleton, New York, police chief Kevin Garvey witnesses a man, Dean, shooting a dog. Kevin's wife, Laurie, has left him to join the Guilty Remnant (GR), a cult-like organization. His son, Tom, has left to become a follower of messianic figure Holy Wayne. His delinquent daughter, Jill, and her friend, Aimee, live with him. Local pastor Matt Jamison angers the townspeople by arguing that the Departure was not the Rapture. The town's mayor plans a parade to honor the victims of the Departure. During the parade, local woman Nora Durst reveals her husband and two children departed. After the GR begin their protest, Kevin cannot prevent the townspeople from attacking them. Kevin visits the GR's houses and begs Laurie to return home, but she refuses to speak to him. Meg Abbott, who the GR have been stalking, asks if she can stay at the GR's houses. Kevin encounters Dean again and the two of them witness a pack of dogs killing a deer, leading the pair to shoot the pack together.
2	2	"Penguin One, Us Zero"	Peter Berg	Damon Lindelof & Kath Lingenfelter	July 6, 2014	4X5702	1.553
Two weeks later, the Bureau of Alcohol, Tobacco, Firearms, Explosives, and Cults (ATFEC) assault Holy Wayne's compound after suspecting that Wayne is a sex offender. (Wayne claims to need to have sex with teenage Asian girls to "recharge" his ability to supposedly hug people's pain away.) Tom manages to escape with Wayne and Christine, one of Wayne's girls whom he has impregnated. Realizing that ATFEC will find him eventually and believing that Christine's child will carry on his ability, Wayne goes on the run, leaving Tom to care for Christine. Kevin has a strange dream and, after visiting his institutionalized father Kevin Garvey Sr. (Mapleton's former police chief), he begins to question his own sanity. Jill and Aimee see Nora at a coffee shop, notice she has a gun in her purse and are baffled when she intentionally spills her coffee. Intrigued by her gun, Jill and Aimee spend the rest of the day following Nora, discovering that she is Matt's sister. Meg spends weeks living in the GR's pledge house with Laurie as her mentor, and gradually becomes more accepting of the group's practices and induction rituals.
3	3	"Two Boats and a Helicopter"	Keith Gordon	Damon Lindelof & Jacqueline Hoyt	July 13, 2014	4X5703	1.380
Matt faces dwindling church attendance and abuse from the townspeople as he continues to preach his belief that the Departure was not the Rapture and that those who departed were often sinners. He faces foreclosure from his bank and is told that a buyer made an offer of $135,000 on the church. The bank gives Matt an ultimatum: if he can raise $135,000 by the foreclosure date, he can keep the church. Matt returns home to care for his wife Mary (who has been in a vegetative state since a car accident during the Departure) and receives what he takes to be a sign from God, remembering that Kevin Sr. buried money in the Garveys' yard. Matt retrieves the money, goes to a casino and bets it in a game of roulette. Matt wins and earns enough money to buy back his church. Upon returning to Mapleton, Matt is knocked unconscious by a group of people throwing stones at members of the GR. After awakening in a hospital, he is devastated to discover that several days have passed and he has missed the foreclosure date. The buyer of his church is revealed to be the GR.
4	4	"B.J. and the A.C."	Lesli Linka Glatter & Carl Franklin	Damon Lindelof & Elizabeth Peterson	July 20, 2014	4X5704	1.621
As Christmas approaches, the baby Jesus from Mapleton's nativity display goes missing. The mayor, Lucy Warburton, announces that Kevin will find it, while she secretly tasks him with buying a new one and roughing it up to appear lost. Kevin thinks Jill and Aimee (along with their friends Adam and Scott Frost) stole the baby Jesus, which later appears on his doorstep. However, to Kevin's surprise, Matt has already replaced the baby with another doll. Tom and Christine have been on the run for weeks and have had no contact from Wayne, much to Tom's chagrin. After Christine is attacked by a man, Tom takes her to the hospital. They are forced to flee after the staff assume Tom has abused her and call the police. Kevin visits the GR's houses and tells them to leave the townspeople alone over Christmas and says he cannot protect them if they continue their provocative behavior. During Mapleton's Christmas dance, Kevin meets Nora and the two become attracted to one another. The GR break into houses across town and steal photos of people who departed. Laurie visits Kevin to hand him divorce papers and receives a lighter as a gift from Jill.
5	5	"Gladys"	Mimi Leder	Damon Lindelof & Tom Perrotta	July 27, 2014	4X5705	1.588
Public outrage against the GR is amplified upon discovery of the stolen photos. Gladys, one of the GR's most loyal members, is brutally stoned to death by a group of unseen assailants. Kevin visits the GR's houses to remind them of his warning to not provoke the town. Patti Levin, the leader of the GR, takes Laurie to a diner, gives her regular clothes to wear and tells her she can speak normally. Laurie wears the clothes but refuses to speak, believing Patti is testing her loyalty. Kevin attempts to lead an investigation into Gladys' murder, but finds that no one in the Mapleton Police Department is interested in investigating it due to Gladys' GR ties. Much to Kevin's anger, one of his deputies sends Gladys' body to ATFEC for investigation, effectively ending Kevin's own investigation. Kevin attempts to retrieve the body and in doing so discovers that ATFEC has offered to wipe out the GR in Mapleton, as it has done with similar cults across the country. Kevin declines the offer; meanwhile, Gladys' body is incinerated without any investigation.
6	6	"Guest"	Carl Franklin	Damon Lindelof & Kath Lingenfelter	August 3, 2014	4X5706	1.468
While wearing a ballistic vest, Nora instructs an escort to shoot her. After discovering that her departed husband was having an affair, she decides to file for divorce. At the courthouse, she encounters Kevin, who is also filing for divorce. Nora, working for the Department of the Sudden Departure (DSD) as a fraud investigator, attends a Departure-related conference in New York City. There, her lanyard is stolen by a woman who is impersonating her. She wanders the hotel, finds a party, becomes intoxicated and makes out with the lifelike Departure replica doll of a salesman who had made advances toward her. Nora encounters Patrick Johansen, a man who lost four members of his family in the Departure and wrote a bestselling book explaining how he moved on. Nora accuses Johansen of being a fraud, claiming that anyone who really lost their entire family would know that moving on is impossible. An associate of Holy Wayne (who is hiding in New York) overhears Nora and invites her to meet Wayne, who explains her obsession with pain and then hugs her, seemingly purging her anxieties. When Nora returns to Mapleton, Kevin asks her out on a date. She happily agrees.
7	7	"Solace for Tired Feet"	Mimi Leder	Damon Lindelof & Jacqueline Hoyt	August 10, 2014	4X5707	1.580
Jill is locked in a refrigerator by Aimee and the Frost twins as a part of a dare. Jill wins the dare but panics when the others are unable to open the door until Kevin Sr. suddenly arrives and rescues her. Kevin Sr., apparently having broken out of the psychiatric hospital, asks Jill not to tell Kevin that she saw him and runs off into the forest. Kevin and Nora's date is interrupted by Meg and another GR member staking out Nora's house. Wayne contacts Tom and instructs him to tape money to the bottom of a mailbox. Tom does so and watches the mailbox, following a man who takes the money to a house. Tom discovers that the man is another of Wayne's disciples who is also caring for a pregnant Asian girl, leading him to further question his loyalty to Wayne. When he returns to Christine, he is shocked to learn that her baby has been born. After learning that he has escaped the hospital, Kevin tracks down his father, who has been hearing voices since the Departure. The two fight after Kevin Sr. attempts to recruit his son to his supposed "mission," but he is eventually returned to the hospital.
8	8	"Cairo"	Michelle MacLaren	Curtis Gwinn & Carlito Rodriguez	August 17, 2014	4X5708	1.636
The GR receive Departure replicas and dress them at Patti's behest. Kevin invites Nora over for dinner with Jill and Aimee; Jill confronts Nora about her gun, and Nora claims to have gotten rid of it, offering Jill proof by allowing her to look through Nora's purse. Jill later breaks into Nora's house and finds the gun hidden in a box under the bed. That night, Kevin falls asleep and awakens hours later in his car without any recollection of how he got there. He is now in a forest near Cairo, New York, and he and Dean have apparently kidnapped and beaten Patti. After Kevin tries to release Patti, Dean leaves and claims that Kevin has changed, implying that the pair have repeatedly met before, but Kevin does not remember this. While speaking about the GR and their motives, Patti tries to persuade Kevin to kill her. When he refuses, deciding to release Patti and face the consequences, she commits suicide by slitting her own throat. In Mapleton, Laurie leads the GR in Patti's absence. Jill and Aimee have a falling out, leading Aimee to move out of the Garvey house and Jill to join the GR.
9	9	"The Garveys at Their Best"	Daniel Sackheim	Kath Lingenfelter & Damon Lindelof	August 24, 2014	4X5709	1.851
Days before the Departure, a surprise party is planned for Kevin Sr., who is still chief of police. Laurie is a psychiatrist and Patti one of her patients, who senses an upcoming apocalyptic event which Laurie dismisses as anxiety caused by spousal abuse. Tom, who is actually Kevin's stepson, has a violent confrontation with his biological father, who Kevin (who is still a police officer) then attacks. Kevin notices strange occurrences around the town, including a manhole cover exploding and a deer that is wreaking havoc. Jill, happy and well-adjusted, prepares for a science fair. Nora interviews for a job working on the election campaign for councilwoman and future mayor Lucy Warburton. Kevin chases the deer to a house where it flees and is hit by a car. The driver is a woman who invites him to her hotel room. During the Departure, Kevin is in mid-coitus with her when she disappears; Nora snaps at her family right before they disappear; Jill and Tommy form a circuit at the science fair where one child disappears; Laurie, who is revealed to be pregnant, has an ultrasound and witnesses the disappearance of her unborn child.
10	10	"The Prodigal Son Returns"	Mimi Leder	Damon Lindelof & Tom Perrotta	September 7, 2014	4X5710	1.531
Matt, who Kevin called for help following Patti's suicide, helps bury the body. The GR are revealed to have made life-like replicas of the departed townspeople and placed them in the locations where they disappeared. Laurie worries that their latest protest will anger Mapleton and asks Jill to go home. Tom is horrified when Christine abandons her newborn baby in a public restroom and leaves. While eating in a diner with Matt, Kevin admits he wants his family to reunite. In the bathroom, Kevin encounters a mortally-wounded Wayne who dies after granting Kevin an unspoken wish. Kevin later hallucinates a conversation with Patti. Arriving in Mapleton, Matt and Kevin come upon a riot by the townspeople, resulting in the GR's houses being set on fire. Laurie speaks again when she screams out to Kevin that Jill is in one of the burning houses; Kevin rushes inside and rescues her. Tom returns to Mapleton with the baby and finds Laurie. Nora, believing that it is best for her to leave town, writes a letter to Kevin but finds Christine's baby on his doorstep. Returning to the house, Kevin and Jill find Nora with the baby in her arms.

=== Season 2 (2015) ===
The second season consists of ten episodes and aired from October 10 to December 6, 2015. It takes place a year after the first season, centering on the fourth anniversary of the Departure. While some scenes take place in Mapleton, New York (the first season's setting) and other locations, the majority of the season takes place in Jarden, Texas, also known as Miracle, a town from which no one departed. The town has become a tourist site and a popular destination, leading Kevin, Nora, Matt and other characters from the first season to move to Miracle. New characters introduced include town staples the Murphy family: father John, mother Erika, daughter Evie and son Michael.

The second season follows multiple storylines, notably the ideological battle between those who believe Miracle is special and those who do not, Kevin and Nora's relationship being tested by Kevin's increasingly erratic mental state, the Murphy family's search for their missing daughter, and Matt's attempts to prove the existence of a miracle only he witnessed.

The opening theme for all ten episodes is "Let the Mystery Be" by Iris DeMent.

No. overall	No. in season	Title	Directed by	Written by	Original release date	Prod. code	U.S. viewers (millions)
11	1	"Axis Mundi"	Mimi Leder	Damon Lindelof & Jacqueline Hoyt	October 4, 2015	4X6051	0.713
In prehistoric times, the sole survivor of an earthquake gives birth. The next day, she dies while saving her baby from a rattlesnake. A cavewoman from another tribe finds the baby and takes it. In the present, the fourth anniversary of the Departure approaches. Jarden, Texas, now inside a national park known as "Miracle," has become a tourist destination after it was discovered that no one from the town departed. Matt moves to Miracle with Mary to become its temporary pastor while the regular one undergoes surgery. Kevin, Nora, Jill and Lily (Christine's daughter who the Garveys have adopted) move into Jarden and meet the Murphys.: John, a firefighter who denies that Miracle is special; his wife Erika, a doctor; his epileptic daughter Evie; and his son Michael, a lector at the church who secretly visits his grandfather Virgil whom his parents have disowned. Fortune-teller Isaac predicts a disastrous event in John's future. Angered, John and other firefighters burn down Isaac's house. That night, an earthquake hits Miracle and the Murphys discover that Evie and two of her friends have gone missing. Their car, still running, is abandoned by a lake. The lake's water also vanished.
12	2	"A Matter of Geography"	Mimi Leder	Damon Lindelof & Tom Perrotta	October 11, 2015	4X6052	0.552
Weeks after the attack on the GR's houses, Kevin exhumes Patti's body at Cairo. Troubled over his role in Patti's death, he purposely speeds past a police car. When pulled over, he informs the trooper of the body in his truck. Despite being questioned, he is released after the investigating ATFEC officer learns that Kevin is Mapleton's chief of police. As Patti was in the GR, she has no interest in investigating Kevin's story about the suicide. Kevin later hallucinates a conversation with Patti. Kevin Sr. is released from the psychiatric hospital (claiming he did what the voices in his head told him to), planning to live in Australia. Similarly, Kevin decides to relocate to Jarden with his new family. Outside Jarden, people who attempted to move to Miracle but were denied entry set up a camp. Kevin's family quickly learn that the house they leased online burned down. Nora, who sold her Mapleton house to scientists researching the Departure, purchases an auctioned house in Miracle for $3 million. That night, Kevin awakens at the bottom of the drained lake with a cinder block tied to his ankle, close to where the girls' car was abandoned.
13	3	"Off Ramp"	Carl Franklin	Damon Lindelof & Patrick Somerville	October 18, 2015	4X6053	0.777
After giving up Lily, Tom reunited with Laurie. The pair now travel across the country deprograming GR members. Laurie, having resumed her role as therapist, runs a support group for former GR members. Tom infiltrates GR factions to identify disillusioned members and help them escape into Laurie's support group. Laurie has been suppressing many of her feelings about abandoning her family and joining the GR, and intentionally hits two GR members with her car when she sees them staking out a house. She also becomes consumed with writing a book about her experiences in the GR which she hopes will decimate that organisation. A woman in her support group kills herself and her family. Distraught, Laurie attacks a publisher after he suggests making sentimental edits to her book. While attempting to help someone join the support group, Tom is beaten, raped, and nearly lit on fire by Meg. He later questions Laurie's motive for involving him in her anti-GR efforts. Realizing the people they recruit need something to fill the void that the GR filled, Tom tells a false story to the support group about how Holy Wayne approached him before he died and transferred his powers onto him.
14	4	"Orange Sticker"	Tom Shankland	Damon Lindelof & Tom Spezialy	October 25, 2015	4X6054	0.519
On the night of the earthquake, Kevin explains to Nora that he woke up at the bottom of the lake but cannot remember how he got there. They agree that Kevin should remain silent concerning his proximity to the girls. He joins the search party, with the ulterior motive of finding his missing phone. A handprint is eventually found on the girls' car, which Kevin realizes is his own. John takes out his grief at Evie's disappearance on Isaac. With a baseball bat, he tries to kill Isaac, who shoots John in self-defence. Erika stitches John up and confesses to Kevin that John was not a violent man before the Departure. Unlike John, she thinks Miracle is special. Nora visits Matt for reassurance that Miracle is safe from the Departure, leading Matt to recount that his faith in Miracle began the night he and Mary first arrived, when Mary temporarily awoke from her coma. Patti tells Kevin he tried to kill himself the night. Nora insists on handcuffing herself to Kevin while they sleep.
15	5	"No Room at the Inn"	Nicole Kassell	Damon Lindelof & Jacqueline Hoyt	November 1, 2015	4X6055	0.625
Since Mary's temporary recovery, Matt has been duplicating the circumstances of that day to no avail. Frustrated, he takes Mary to Austin, Texas to get an MRI and discovers she is pregnant. Returning to Miracle, they come upon a man and his young son with car trouble. Matt stops to assist, and the man assaults him and steals both of their wristbands, allowing access to the exclusive town. Mary seemingly awakens for an instant and proclaims that the baby will die if she does not return to Miracle. Lacking their wristbands, they are refused entry. John refuses to sponsor them, believing that Mary's pregnancy is proof that Matt raped her while she was comatose. Nora and Kevin attempt to sneak them in but find the dead body of the wristband thief with his son quivering nearby. After asking Kevin and Nora to care for Mary, Matt takes the boy to John. He tells John to take care of the boy and decide to not enter Miracle again until he can prove that Mary's pregnancy is miraculous. Matt goes to the refugee camp and displays an act of endearment.
16	6	"Lens"	Craig Zobel	Damon Lindelof & Tom Perrotta	November 8, 2015	4X6056	0.636
In the four years since the Departure, the DSD has developed a theory relating to "Lenses": a "Lens" is someone who was in close proximity to a large number of people who departed at the moment of the Departure and is classified as being a risk for those around them departing if there were to be another Departure. A scientist comes to Miracle, believing Nora to be a Lens given that all of her family departed while she was near them and that Evie and her friends supposedly departed the same night she moved to Miracle. Nora is at first offended by the insinuation, then amused after learning that their theory is based on mystical and religious beliefs. During a fundraiser for the missing girls, Erika loses her temper and claims that Miracle is not special and that the girls departed. Nora and Erika later have a candid conversation about their departed children, during which Erika admits that she wanted to leave John and believes that this was responsible for Evie's disappearance. Kevin's conversations with Patti continue to grow in intensity, leading him to tell a horrified Nora about them.
17	7	"A Most Powerful Adversary"	Mimi Leder	Damon Lindelof & Patrick Somerville	November 15, 2015	4X6057	0.610
After revealing to Nora that he speaks to Patti, Kevin awakens to find Nora has left with Mary and Lily. This upsets Jill, who assumes that Kevin has ruined his relationship with Nora just as he did his marriage to Laurie. Michael witnesses Kevin talking to Patti and says his grandfather Virgil can help him with his problem. Kevin met Virgil before – the night he moved to Miracle – and they have already discussed his problem (an encounter Kevin cannot remember). According to Virgil, Patti is Kevin's 'adversary', and he must 'vanquish' her by killing himself and defeating her in the realm of the undead. Virgil already told Kevin this information, the latter tried to kill himself and was foiled by the earthquake draining the lake he had jumped into. Laurie arrives in Miracle, claiming that Tom has run away. Realizing that he is becoming psychotic, Kevin decides to carry through with Virgil's plan. Kevin returns to Virgil and, despite Patti's protests, kills himself by drinking poison. Rather than administering an antidote as promised, Virgil shoots himself in the face.
18	8	"International Assassin"	Craig Zobel	Damon Lindelof & Nick Cuse	November 22, 2015	4X6058	0.696
Kevin awakens into the realm of the undead: a hotel full of people who either believe it is real and are unaware that they are dead or are on a mission to vanquish their adversaries. Kevin is an assassin tasked with killing presidential nominee Patti Levin. Kevin saves a girl from drowning in the pool. He speaks with Kevin Sr. through his television, who is with Indigenous Australians and advises him to take Patti to "the well". Posing as a donor in order to kill Patti, Kevin discovers she is a decoy and not the real Patti Levin. The girl is this world's representation of Patti. She agrees to go with Kevin to an ancient water well, despite knowing that he will kill her. On the way, a mystery man says Kevin will not be the same after killing Patti. Begrudgingly, Kevin pushes Patti into the well. An adult Patti asks for help and Kevin gets in the well. Patti says she won enough money on Jeopardy! to leave her husband, but was too scared to do it. Kevin holds Patti, then drowns her and returns to the world of the living.
19	9	"Ten Thirteen"	Keith Gordon	Damon Lindelof & Monica Beletsky	November 29, 2015	4X6059	0.861
On the day before the Departure, Meg's mother dies, leading her to feel that her ability to grieve was robbed from her. Two years later, Meg and her fiancé journey to Miracle and visit Isaac because of his supposed psychic abilities. Meg asks Isaac what her mother was about to tell her just before she died. Meg then meets Evie. In the present, Meg grows tired of the GR's passive protests. Tom grows tired of Laurie's anti-GR efforts, believing that they have failed to convert a single person, and goes to a GR house, demanding to see Meg. Looking for Tom, Laurie heads to Miracle, where Meg invites Tom to accompany her to for a violent "mission". Meg jokingly reveals she raped Tom because she wanted to get him pregnant. After ordering to have a man who stumbled onto the GR base near Miracle stoned, Meg visits the camp and encounters Matt. Although Meg claims to just be visiting Miracle, Matt believes she may be planning something for the fourth anniversary of the Departure. Tom discovers the missing girls in a trailer. They actually faked their departure and joined the GR.
20	10	"I Live Here Now"	Mimi Leder	Damon Lindelof & Tom Perrotta	December 6, 2015	4X6060	0.993
On the night the girls faked their disappearance, Kevin jumps into the lake with a cinderblock tied to his ankle. In the present, Kevin unearths himself from the ground where Michael buried him after his death. He returns home and encounters a furious John, who has discovered that the handprint on the girls' car belongs to Kevin. Kevin, having recalled his memories of that night, explains that Evie faked her departure, but John shoots him. Another earthquake hits Miracle and Mary awakens, leading Nora to take her to Matt. Meg and Evie initiate the GR's plan: a bomb to destroy the bridge into Miracle. John and Erika are heartbroken when Evie refuses to acknowledge them. The GR infiltrates Miracle, leading way to chaos and destruction by the outsiders. Having died from his bullet wound, Kevin awakens in the realm of the undead, where the mystery man forces Kevin to sing karaoke to return to life. After doing so, Kevin makes his way through the town to Erika's clinic and encounters John a second time. The two tearily reflect on their situation. Kevin goes home, and finds Jill, Laurie, Matt, Mary, Nora, Tom and Lily awaiting his return.

=== Season 3 (2017) ===
The third and final season consists of eight episodes and aired from April 16 to June 4, 2017. It takes place three years after the second season, centering around the seventh anniversary of the Departure. The first two episodes take place in Jarden, Texas (the second season's setting) and other locations, while the final six episodes primarily take place in the state of Victoria, Australia (which the characters believe will be the site of an apocalyptic event on the anniversary of the Departure). Kevin Sr. becomes a main character, after recurring in the first two seasons.

The third season follows multiple storylines, notably Matt and Kevin Sr.'s belief that the seventh anniversary of the Departure will bring an apocalyptic flood in Australia, Kevin coming to terms with his apparent immortality and coming to believe that it is his destiny to prevent the apocalypse, and Nora grappling with a scientific discovery that could reunite her with her family.

The first episode has no opening credits, while the opening theme for the final seven episodes changes with every episode.

No. overall	No. in season	Title	Directed by	Written by	Original release date	Prod. code	U.S. viewers (millions)
21	1	"The Book of Kevin"	Mimi Leder	Damon Lindelof & Patrick Somerville	April 16, 2017	T13.19801	0.895
In 1844, a professed prophet teaches his congregation various failed predictions of a pending celestial event. In the present day, a military drone kills the GR members who invaded Miracle, including Meg and Evie. Three years later, the National Park jurisdiction over "Miracle" has ended, and Jarden is open to the public. Kevin is the police chief in Jarden, Tom is an officer, Nora has returned to work as a DSD agent, John and Laurie are married, Erika and Jill have moved away, and Lily is absent from the Garveys' life. John, with Laurie's support, poses as a mentalist who can bring his customers messages from the dead. Kevin, unable to accept his apparent immortality, comes repeatedly close to killing himself. Matt predicts that something might occur on the upcoming seventh anniversary of the Departure. Mary, fully recovered from her coma, decides to leave Jarden, and Matt, with their son Noah. Matt, with help from Michael and John, have been writing a gospel of Kevin, believing him to be a Christ-like figure who will play an important part in the anniversary. In rural Australia years in the future, an older Nora denies knowing anyone called Kevin.
22	2	"Don't Be Ridiculous"	Keith Gordon	Tom Perrotta & Damon Lindelof (Note: Perrotta and Lindelof are credited on-screen under the pen names "Tha Lonely Donkey Kong" and "Specialist Contagious", respectively. The names come from Perrotta and Lindelof putting their names into a Wu-Tang Clan name generator.)	April 23, 2017	T13.19802	0.776
A man in Jarden dies and Matt helps his widow make it seem as though it was a departure. Nora is contacted by actor Mark Linn-Baker, who claims he represents people who can reunite her with her children if she meets him in St. Louis. Nora meets with Linn-Baker but is convinced he is suicidal after he explains the group he represents have built a radioactive machine which can theoretically "send" people wherever their departures have gone. Nora dismisses the machine as being pseudoscience that incinerates people. Nora drives to Kentucky to see Lily, now living with her mother Christine. Returning to Jarden, Nora discovers Kevin suffocating himself. Kevin tells her he is not suicidal, but does it to feel pain. She gets a call from Linn-Baker's benefactors, who want her to meet them in Melbourne with $20,000. She agrees, ostensibly to uncover the fraud, and Kevin asks to go along. In Australia, a group of women kidnap a police chief named Kevin and drown him, expecting him to return to life. Kevin Sr. witnesses them from inside one of the women's house. Opening theme: "Nothing's Gonna Stop Me Now" by David Pomeranz
23	3	"Crazy Whitefella Thinking"	Mimi Leder	Damon Lindelof & Tom Spezialy	April 30, 2017	T13.20203	0.846
After traveling to Australia on the advice of the voices in his head, Kevin Sr. learns from a prophetic chicken that a flood will come on the seventh anniversary of the Departure, leading him to believe it is his destiny to stop the flood. He travels to various Indigenous communities to learn chants from native tribes (which he believes can stop the flood if he performs them). The last chant he needs to learn is only known by one person: a tribal leader named Christopher Sunday. Through illegal methods, Kevin Sr. finds Sunday and recounts his journey. Despite protesting that his chant cannot stop a flood, Sunday agrees, but dies before he can teach the chant, leaving Kevin Sr. to wander the outback. Kevin Sr. is bitten by a snake and rescued by a woman named Grace, who takes him to her house. Grace reveals that all her children died after she assumed they departed and that she has just killed a police officer who she believed could contact her children, based on a page from Matt's book that Kevin Sr. was carrying. Kevin Sr. reassures her belief, revealing that his son is the Kevin from the book. Opening theme: "Personal Jesus" by Richard Cheese
24	4	"G'Day Melbourne"	Daniel Sackheim	Story by : Damon Lindelof; Teleplay by : Tamara P. Carter & Haley Harris	May 7, 2017	T13.20204	0.812
At Melbourne, Nora is instructed to catch a bus to an abandoned warehouse in Kensington. There, physicists Drs. Eden and Bekker ask Nora if she would allow a child to die if it meant that a cure for cancer could be invented. Nora answers that she would, rationalizing that children die every day, but this leads Eden and Bekker to reject her and leave. After arriving in Australia, Kevin sees Evie outside a window in a television studio in Federation Square and races there to confront her. Claiming to be called Daniah, Evie says she does not know Kevin. Kevin calls Laurie, who warns him against pursuing things further. Kevin ignores her and finds "Daniah" at a public library, leading Laurie to force him to realize that the girl is not Evie and that he has been hallucinating. Reeling from the day's events, Kevin burns Matt's book and, after fighting with Nora, leaves the hotel. Outside he finds Kevin Sr, who spotted him on live television that morning. While Kevin Sr alludes to "the explosion," there is chaos in the streets. Grace, Kevin and Kevin drive away, leaving Nora alone in the hotel. Opening theme: "This Love is Over" by Ray Lamontagne and the Pariah Dogs
25	5	"It's a Matt, Matt, Matt, Matt World"	Nicole Kassell	Lila Byock & Damon Lindelof	May 14, 2017	T13.20205	0.919
A Marine Nationale submariner launches a nuclear weapon at an island in the South Pacific Ocean, leading to all air traffic being grounded. Matt disagrees with Kevin Sr.'s interpretation of the impending apocalypse and believes that Kevin must return to Jarden. Matt charters an airplane to Melbourne to bring Kevin home and Laurie, John, and Michael accompany him. The grounding of flights forces the party to land in Tasmania and board a passenger ship (which is hosting a "pride" of people that celebrate the lineage of "Frasier, the Sensuous Lion" through mass copulation). The mystery man from the realm of the undead is onboard, revealed to be someone named David Burton who claims to be God. Burton throws a man overboard and Matt, unable to convince the captain of the murder, kidnaps Burton. Matt questions him and Burton reveals that he has not noticed anything that Matt has done for him. They arrive in Melbourne and Matt reveals to the others that his cancer has returned. The captain informs Matt that a body was found in the ocean and that Burton will be taken into custody. Burton attempts escape but is mauled by one of Frasier's descendants. Opening theme: "Ashrei" by Benzion Miller
26	6	"Certified"	Carl Franklin	Patrick Somerville & Carly Wray	May 21, 2017	T13.20206	0.770
Shortly after the Departure, Laurie attempts suicide before changing her mind and joining the GR. In the present, Matt and Laurie meet with Nora while John and Michael go to find Kevin. Nora spies on Eden and Bekker, having decided that she wants to go through the machine now that her relationship with Kevin has crumbled. The trio track down the machine to a truck parked on a highway by the ocean. Nora hesitates, unable to decide what to do, and Laurie tries to persuade her to do her job and report the fraud to the DSD, implying that the machine cannot take her pain away. Matt stays with Nora while Laurie goes to join John, Michael, Kevin, Kevin Sr. and Grace. Kevin Sr. has persuaded Kevin to drown himself, go the realm of the undead and deliver messages: John wants him to tell Evie that she was loved, Grace wants answers about her children's fate, and Kevin Sr. wants Christopher Sunday to teach him the last chant. Jill and Tom call Laurie before she goes scuba diving. Laurie ends the phone call by telling them she loves them both. Opening theme: "1-800 Suicide" by Gravediggaz
27	7	"The Most Powerful Man in the World (and His Identical Twin Brother)"	Craig Zobel	Nick Cuse & Damon Lindelof	May 28, 2017	T13.20207	0.804
The rain begins in Australia. Kevin is drowned and returns to the realm of the undead, where he is again an assassin and must assassinate the President: his identical twin brother. Kevin discovers that, by looking into any reflective surface, he can switch consciousness between the two brothers. As the President, he encounters Grace's children and Evie, none of whom give meaningful responses to his messages. Kevin is alerted that there is an imminent nuclear threat and goes to a military bunker to plan a response, aided by his Secretary of Defense (Patti). Patti manipulates Kevin to launch a nuclear attack, requiring him to cut the launch key out from inside the heart of assassin Kevin. As the assassin, Kevin arrives at the bunker and calls Christopher Sunday, who refuses to teach him the chant. Assassin Kevin is captured and brought to President Kevin. Before they carry out their task, the two Kevins realize their regret in their handling of Nora. Patti and President Kevin watch the nuclear apocalypse as Kevin returns to the world of the living, where the rain has stopped, implying that there was never any flood to begin with and that the prophecy was false. Opening theme: reprise of Season 1's "The Leftovers (Main Title Theme)" by Max Richter
28	8	"The Book of Nora"	Mimi Leder	Story by : Tom Spezialy & Damon Lindelof; Teleplay by : Tom Perrotta & Damon Lindelof	June 4, 2017	T13.20208	1.049
After saying goodbye to Matt, Nora enters the machine. Many years later, an older Nora lives alone in a rural Australian town. One day, an older Kevin arrives at her doorstep, seemingly unable to remember anything that happened between the two other than the time they met at the school dance. Kevin asks her to go to a local dance with him. She rebuffs him, then calls Laurie to accuse her of revealing her whereabouts to Kevin, which Laurie states that she did not. Several days later, Kevin reveals the truth: he has searched for Nora every year since they last saw each other but did not know how to approach her when he found her, and so acted as if their relationship never happened. He refused to believe that Nora was gone, even after Matt died from cancer and she did not attend the funeral. Nora says that the machine transported her to an alternate reality where 98% of the population departed, leaving the 2% that are missing from this world, but decided to return to this world after learning her family was happy and had moved on. Kevin says that he believes her and the two feel relief, having been reunited. Opening theme: reprise of Season 2's "Let the Mystery Be" by Iris DeMent

== Ratings ==
The Leftovers : U.S. viewers per episode (millions)

Season	Episode number										Average
Season	1	2	3	4	5	6	7	8	9	10	Average
1	1.77	1.55	1.38	1.62	1.59	1.47	1.58	1.64	1.85	1.53	1.60
2	0.71	0.55	0.78	0.52	0.63	0.64	0.61	0.70	0.86	0.99	0.70
3	0.90	0.78	0.85	0.81	0.92	0.77	0.80	1.05	–		0.86

Audience measurement performed by Nielsen Media Research
