= Infamous Angel =

Studio album by Iris DeMent
- Released: October 7, 1992
- Studio: Cowboy Arms (Nashville, Tennessee)
- Genre: Country folk
- Length: 38:28
- Label: Rounder (Philo), Warner from 1993
- Producer: Jim Rooney

Iris DeMent chronology
Infamous Angel (1992)	My Life (1994)

Infamous Angel is the debut studio album by American country music singer-songwriter Iris DeMent. It was released by Philo Records in 1992. The liner notes were written by John Prine, to whom DeMent's music has been compared by Los Angeles Times critic Robert Hilburn.

In 1995, her song "Our Town" was played in the closing moments of the last episode for the CBS TV series Northern Exposure. It has been recorded by Kate Rusby, Jody Stecher, Kate Brislin, and Trampled by Turtles

The Transatlantic Sessions version of "Let the Mystery Be" became the theme song for the second season and series finale of The Leftovers. Darren Hayman and David Tattersall released a cover of "Hotter Than Mojave in My Heart" in 2026 as a bonus to the Hayman, Watkins, Trout And Lee album.

Professional ratings
Review scores
Source	Rating
AllMusic	5/5 stars
Chicago Tribune	3/4 stars
Christgau's Consumer Guide	B+
The Encyclopedia of Popular Music	3/5 stars
Entertainment Weekly	A
The New Rolling Stone Album Guide	3.5/5 stars
Pitchfork	9.0/10
Spin Alternative Record Guide	5/10

== Track listing ==
All songs by Iris DeMent except as indicated.

1. "Let the Mystery Be" – 2:46
2. "These Hills" – 3:40
3. "Hotter Than Mojave in My Heart" – 2:33
4. "When Love Was Young" – 3:38
5. "Our Town" – 4:58
6. "50 Miles of Elbow Room" (Rev F.W. McGee) – 3:12
7. "Infamous Angel" – 3:46
8. "Sweet Forgiveness" – 2:44
9. "After You're Gone" – 4:04
10. "Mama's Opry" – 3:25
11. "Higher Ground" (listed as "Traditional" in the liner notes but in fact by Johnson Oatman, Jr. (lyrics) and Charles H. Gabriel (music)) – 3:34

== Personnel ==
- Iris DeMent – lead and harmony vocals, guitar

Additional musicians

- Jeff Black – harmony vocals (11)
- Flora Mae DeMent – lead vocals (11)
- Jerry Douglas – Dobro (7)
- Stuart Duncan – fiddle, mandolin
- Emmylou Harris – harmony vocals, guitar (10)
- Mark Howard – guitar
- Jeff Hushkins – bass
- Roy Huskey, Jr. – bass
- Hal Ketchum – harmony vocals (11)
- Al Perkins – Dobro (1–6, 8–11)
- Jim Rooney – producer, harmony vocals (6, 11)
- Pete Wasner – piano

Technical

- Richard Adler – recording and mixing engineer
- Kelley McRae - cover photography

== Charts ==
Chart (1996)	Peak position
Australian Albums (ARIA Charts)	83
