= Two Boats and a Helicopter =

- The Leftovers episode
- Episode no.: Season 1 Episode 3
- Directed by: Keith Gordon
- Written by: Damon Lindelof; Jacqueline Hoyt
- Production code: 4X5703
- Original air date: July 13, 2014
- Running time: 51 minutes

Guest appearances
- Janel Moloney as Mary Jamison; Marceline Hugot as Gladys; Wayne Duvall as Detective Louis Vitello; Mike Houston as Porter (Casino Manager)

Episode chronology
← Previous "Penguin One, Us Zero"	Next → "B.J. and the A.C."
- The Leftovers season 1

"Two Boats and a Helicopter" is the third episode of the first season of the HBO drama television series The Leftovers. The episode was written by Damon Lindelof and Jacqueline Hoyt and directed by Keith Gordon. It aired in the United States on July 13, 2014.

Whereas the first two episodes of the series followed protagonist Kevin Garvey, "Two Boats and a Helicopter" shifts perspective to focus on the character of Matt Jamison, an Episcopalian priest causing controversy around the town of Mapleton following the Sudden Departure. The episode follows Matt in his ordeal to save his church from an impending foreclosure.

"Two Boats and a Helicopter" received critical acclaim, with many reviewers calling it a significant improvement over the first two episodes. Particular praise was given to Christopher Eccleston's central performance, as well as the episode's script, pace, and surreal elements.

== Plot ==
In the years since the Sudden Departure, Reverend Matt Jamison spends much of his time defaming members of the Departed he finds to have committed sin, placing posters around Mapleton exposing the individuals' sordid pasts. While Matt views this as a noble effort to separate the innocent from the guilty, his actions court frequent controversy from the town's residents, and his church attendance has begun to dwindle. One of Matt's sermons is interrupted by a relative of one of the outed "sinners" who beats him.

Matt's shrinking congregation has hampered his ability to pay mortgage on the church. He learns from the bank that an undisclosed LLC has made an offer of $135,000 on the church, which the bank will accept unless Matt manages to produce the same amount by the next day. Matt requests the money from Nora, his sister, but she accepts only under the condition that he end his public-shaming campaign. Matt is reluctant to do so, and reveals to Nora that her husband (who disappeared along with their two children) was having an affair with the kids' preschool teacher. Nora is devastated and asks Matt to leave.

Matt returns home to tend to his comatose wife, Mary. He remembers that Kevin Garvey Sr., the former police chief, left him $20,000 buried in the Garveys' backyard. While going to collect it, Matt gets the idea to acquire the rest of the money by gambling it at a nearby Indian casino, which was frequented by a "sinful" departed relative of one of his congregation members. He bets the $20,000 at a roulette table and manages to win three rounds in a row, earning him $160,000. Matt collects the money in an envelope and returns to his car, but one of the onlookers from the game attempts to rob him of his earnings. Matt brutally beats the thief in a rage and takes back the envelope.

On his way back to town, Matt sees two members of the Guilty Remnant being pelted with stones by the passengers of a nearby car. He stops to help them, only to be knocked out by a rock himself. While unconscious, Matt experiences a series of surreal visions charting moments of his past: his cancer diagnosis, his parents burning alive in a house fire during his childhood, and the car crash he and Mary suffered on October 14, which left her in a vegetative state. Matt additionally hallucinates himself having sex with Mary, who suddenly reappears as Laurie Garvey, before Matt finds himself and the bed set ablaze, causing him to wake up.

Matt rushes to the bank with the cash in hand, but is told that he is three days late and that the church has been sold. Matt realizes he was hospitalized after his injury and was unconscious throughout his recovery. He returns to the church to find that its buyers were the Guilty Remnant, who have begun painting the walls white and throwing away church items. Patti Levin, the GR's local leader, is seen removing the lettering from the church's sign, and makes prolonged eye contact with Matt.

== Production ==
"Two Boats and a Helicopter" is the first episode of The Leftovers that does not focus on protagonist Kevin Garvey (actor Justin Theroux makes only a brief appearance at the beginning of the episode). The character of Matt Jamison has a relatively minor role in Tom Perrotta's source novel, but showrunner Lindelof decided to expand on the character after a conversation with Eccleston, feeling the series needed a more prominent character to represent the role of faith in the narrative. Eccleston had initially auditioned for the role of Kevin, but was turned down; he eventually expressed interest in playing Matt after reading Perrotta's novel, and helped convince Lindelof to give the character a more significant role in the series. In an interview with Rolling Stone regarding the episode, Eccleston elaborated on his interpretation of Matt's character:

...it seemed pretty obvious to me that a man of God, one who's been left behind in something akin to a Biblical rapture, that there would be a lot of dramatic potential there. (...) It's pretty obvious that, even with the small amount of screen time that he has in the first two episodes, that this is a man who is in denial of his own pain. He's clearly externalizing it by trying to convince others that this is no act of God that's happened, and that somehow, this will make everyone feel better. And that it will somehow ease the pain of what's happened to his wife, fix the ruins of what's happened to his family and fix the doubts that are plaguing him about his belief system in the aftermath of the Departure.

Critics noted that the episode's title refers to a religious parable about a man who awaits God's help amidst a flood while refusing help from others, only to die and realize that the offers of rescue were indeed what God had provided.

== Reception ==
=== Ratings ===
Upon airing, the episode was watched by 1.380 million viewers with an 18-49 rating of 0.7.

=== Critical reception ===
"Two Boats and a Helicopter" was acclaimed by critics, who praised the episode for its themes, heightened pace, and Eccleston's performance. On Rotten Tomatoes, the episode has an approval rating of 92% based on 12 reviews, with an average score of 8.80/10. The critics' consensus reads, "Gripping and unpredictable, "Two Boats and a Helicopter" focuses on a single character for its duration, and the result is one of the series' best episodes to date."

Matt Fowler of IGN gave the episode a 10 out of 10, calling it a "stunning display of short-form storytelling." Fowler compared the episode to the flashback episodes of Lost, Lindelof's previous series, for exploring the backstory of a single character, and praised Eccleston's "wonderful performance" for capturing the many shades of Matt's character. Sonia Saraiya of The A.V. Club gave the episode an A, referring to the dream sequence as "masterfully done" and describing the episode overall as having "the unsettled, roiling mood of madness." Saraiya praised the overall episode as "nothing except an exploration of what it means to be inexplicably—indelibly—human. James Poniewozik of Time noted that the episode convinced him to keep watching the rest of the season, also comparing the episode to the flashbacks in Lost, but noting, "The Leftovers is distinctively its own thing: its characters are torn not between faith and science but between purpose and despair."

Alan Sepinwall of Uproxx praised the episode as a "bizarre, marvelous, freaky, abrupt left turn" for the series, highlighting its portrayal of "cosmic forces" affecting the series' world and characters, as well as Eccleston's "knockout performance." Brandon Ambrosino of Vox called the episode "perfect television," noting its many allegories for Christian theology - particularly what he perceived as a series of baptisms Matt undergoes in the episode. Ambrosio additionally praised the brief scene depicting Laurie staking out the Garvey household as "simple and understated" for what it reflected about the character, as well as Max Richter's score, which he called "angelic" and "haunting." However, he reserved mild criticism for the scene between Matt and Nora, calling the dialogue "slightly overwritten" and lacking the "pulled-back nuance that shines through in other scenes."

=== Analysis ===
Several critics identified parallels to Christian theology in the episode's story. In his review, Ambrosino provided in-depth analyses of multiple Christian themes he felt were reflected in the episode. For example, a hymn board next to Matt in the church places the events of the episode on January 6, the Christian feast day of Epiphany, named after a New Testament term that can be interpreted as referring to the Rapture (a key basis for the Sudden Departure, the series' central event). Ambrosino also examined numerous symbols of Christianity present in the episode, such as a cross (the "universal symbol of a broken body") being placed near the bathtub in which Matt bathes his paralyzed wife, as well as a 16th-century Albrecht Dürer painting on Matt's wall depicting Job (Matt frequently gazes at the painting in the episode during moments of personal reflection, and Perrotta has referred to Matt as the series' version of Job). Saraiya pointed to the likely significance of Matt having missed his payment by three days (partly owing to an injury that rendered him unconscious), given that the resurrection of Jesus occurred over the same time period. Sepinwall felt that the religious parable providing the episode its namesake was reflected in Matt's series of misfortunes, stating, "Matt, like the man in the parable from the title, either puts too much misguided faith in God, or simply doesn't read the signals correctly."
