= Annie Q. Riegel =

American actress (born 1992)

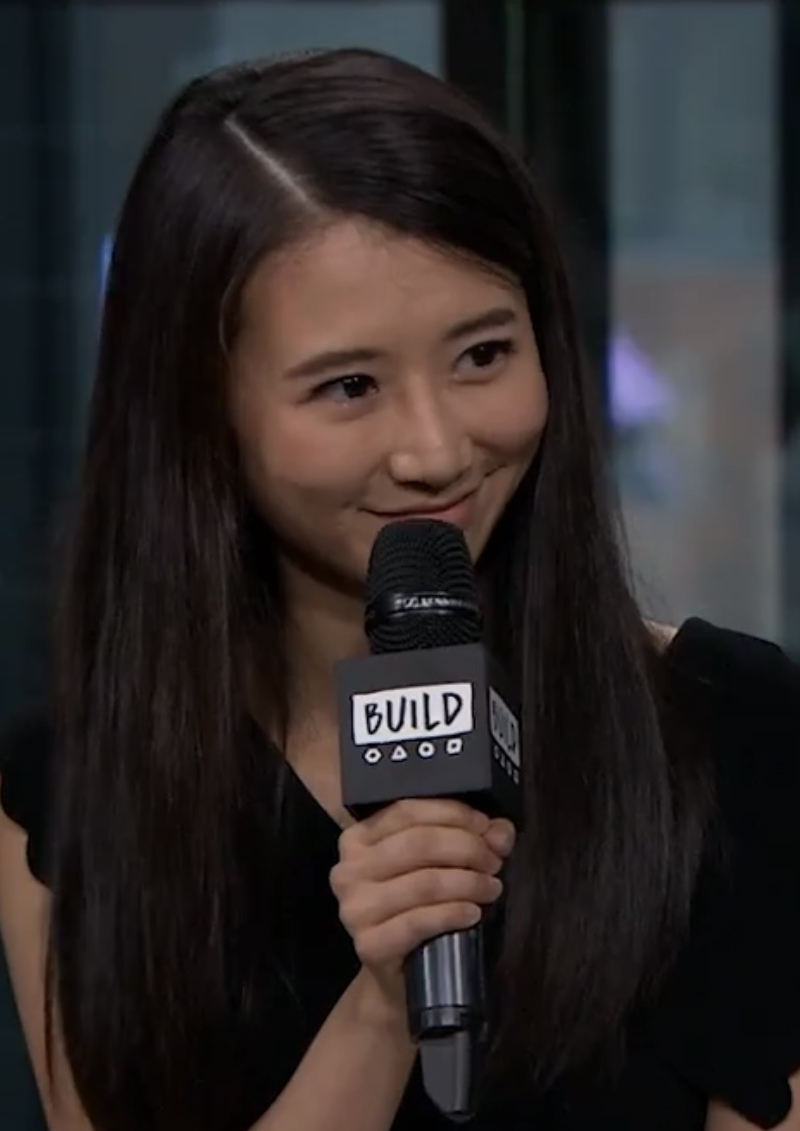
- Annie Q. Riegel on Build Series in 2018
- Born: Annie Qian; July 17, 1992 (age 34); New York City, New York, U.S.
- Education: New York University
- Occupation: Actress
- Years active: 2007–present
- Spouse: Chris Robert Riegel (m. 2017)

Annie Q. Riegel (born Annie Qian, July 17, 1992) is an American actress, best known for her portrayal of Christine in The Leftovers (2014-2017), and recurring roles in Kung Fu (2022) and Death and Other Details (2024).

== Early life and education ==
Riegel was born in Brooklyn, New York. She grew up between Beijing and New York City, speaking both Mandarin Chinese and English with her family at home. Her acceptance into Fiorello H. LaGuardia High School began her interest in acting. She went on to attend New York University Stern School of Business and Tisch School of the Arts for finance and film.

== Career ==
As a child, Riegel appeared in several commercials, short films and episodic television work. After graduating high school, she made her stage debut in 2012 playing the title role from youth to old age, in Tony Award-winning playwright David Henry Hwang's Golden Child revival at the Signature Theatre. Erik Haagensen of Backstage described her performance as "10-year-old Ahn [as] radiantly mischievous, a quality she smartly retains when Ahn is 60." In 2013, she was cast as a series regular in the HBO television series The Leftovers. In 2014, she appeared in Marc Lawrence's romantic comedy The Rewrite. In 2018, she appeared in the Ben Stiller-produced Netflix film Alex Strangelove. In 2019, she was announced as one of the cast members of Into the Dark's back-to-school installment, "School Spirit", which premiered on Hulu two months later. She is the first Asian American lead in Blumhouse production history. In January 2022, she was cast in a recurring role as Juliette Tan for Kung Fu (2021–2023), a reboot of the 1972 series of the same name. In August 2022, she joined the cast of the Hulu television series Death and Other Details. As a voiceover artist, she has narrated many audiobooks, and her work has garnered her an AudioFile magazine Earphones Award.

== Personal life ==
In 2017, she married filmmaker Chris Robert Riegel. They reside between California, Florida, and England. In January 2025, Riegel was named among the initial investors in the UpShot League, a professional women's basketball league.

== Filmography ==
=== Film ===
All roles credited to Annie Q, unless otherwise noted.

Year	Title	Role	Notes
2007	Paper Girl	Young Peiyu	Short film (as Annie Qian)
2008	Picture Day	Portrait kid	Short film (as Annie Qian)
2011	Room #11	Anna	Short film (as Annie Qian)
2013	Breathe In	Chloe	
2013	Innocence	Chloe Murray	
2014	The Rewrite	Sara Liu	(as Annie Qian)
2015	Fan Girl	Rosemarie	
2017	MDMA	Angie	a.k.a. Angie X
2017	Ten	Kumiko	
2017	Trouble	Elise	
2018	Alex Strangelove	Sophie Hicks	

=== Television ===
All roles credited to Annie Q, unless otherwise noted.

Year	Title	Role	Notes
2010	Law & Order: Special Victims Unit	Girl	Episode: "Disabled"
2011	Blue Bloods	Girl	Episode: "My Funny Valentine"
2011–2012	Are We There Yet?	Kelly	Recurring role (seasons 2–3)
2014, 2017	The Leftovers	Christine	Main cast (season 1), guest (season 3 episode)
2016	Elementary	Wendy	Episode: "Worth Several Cities"
2017	Girls	Rachel DeTapley	Episode: "Hostage Situation"
2018	Blindspot	Riley	Episode: "The Quantico Affair"
2019	Into the Dark	Erica Yang	Episode: "School Spirit"
2022	Kung Fu	Juliette Tan	Recurring role (season 2)
2024	Death and Other Details	Winnie Goh	Recurring role (as Annie Q. Riegel)
2024	Jentry Chau vs. the Underworld	Bai Suzhen (voice)	Episode: "A Night with the Stars"

=== Video games ===
All roles credited to Annie Q, unless otherwise noted.

Year	Title	Role	Notes
2020	Legends of Runeterra	Fanclub President / Kinkou Student	Voice role
2022	Return to Monkey Island	Captain Lila	Voice role

=== Theatre ===
All roles credited to Annie Q, unless otherwise noted.

Year	Title	Role	Venue	Notes
2012	Golden Child	Eng Ahn	Alice Griffin Jewel Box Theatre	Off-Broadway
