= The Leftovers (TV series) =

2014–2017 American supernatural television series

- Intertitle for seasons 2–3
- Genre: Drama; Supernatural fiction; Mystery; Magical realism; Psychological thriller; Philosophical fiction
- Created by: Damon Lindelof; Tom Perrotta
- Based on: The Leftovers by Tom Perrotta
- Showrunner: Damon Lindelof
- Starring: Justin Theroux; Amy Brenneman; Christopher Eccleston; Liv Tyler; Chris Zylka; Margaret Qualley; Carrie Coon; Emily Meade; Amanda Warren; Ann Dowd; Michael Gaston; Max Carver; Charlie Carver; Annie Q.; Janel Moloney; Regina King; Kevin Carroll; Jovan Adepo; Scott Glenn
- Opening theme: "Leftovers Theme" by Max Richter (season 1); "Let the Mystery Be" by Iris DeMent (season 2 and series finale); Various (season 3)
- Composer: Max Richter
- Country of origin: United States
- Original language: English
- No. of seasons: 3
- No. of episodes: 28 (list of episodes)

Production
- Executive producers: Damon Lindelof; Tom Perrotta; Peter Berg; Sarah Aubrey; Mimi Leder; Tom Spezialy; Eugene Kelly
- Producers: Nan Bernstein Freed; Patrick Markey; Alma Kuttruff; Amanda Crittenden
- Production locations: New York (seasons 1–2); Texas (seasons 2–3); Victoria, Australia (season 3)
- Cinematography: Michael Slovis (pilot); Todd McMullen; Michael Grady; John Grillo; Robert Humphreys
- Editors: Colby Parker Jr. (pilot); Henk Van Eeghen; David Eisenberg; Michael Ruscio
- Camera setup: Single-camera
- Running time: 51–72 minutes
- Production companies: White Rabbit Productions; Film 44; Warner Bros. Television; HBO Entertainment

Original release
- Network: HBO
- Release: June 29, 2014 – June 4, 2017

The Leftovers is an American supernatural drama television series created by Damon Lindelof and Tom Perrotta that aired on HBO from June 29, 2014, to June 4, 2017. Based on Perrotta's 2011 novel, the series begins three years after the "Sudden Departure", a global event that resulted in 2% of the world's population disappearing. The lives of police chief Kevin Garvey (Justin Theroux) and his family, along with grieving widow Nora Durst (Carrie Coon) and her brother, Reverend Matt Jamison (Christopher Eccleston), are the focal points of the series as they struggle to adjust to life after the Departure.

The pilot was written by Lindelof and Perrotta and directed by Peter Berg. The series stars an ensemble cast led by Theroux and features Amy Brenneman, Christopher Eccleston, Liv Tyler, Chris Zylka, Margaret Qualley, Carrie Coon, Ann Dowd, Regina King, Jovan Adepo, Kevin Carroll, Janel Moloney, and Scott Glenn. The series was renewed for a second season, which premiered on October 4, 2015, and concluded December 6, 2015. On December 10, 2015, at Lindelof's request to be able to conclude the series, HBO renewed it for a third and final season, which premiered on April 16, 2017, and concluded on June 4, 2017. Over the course of the series, 28 episodes aired over three seasons.

The first season received mostly positive reviews, though one negative review criticized the series for being "clunky" and unsubtle. The series underwent a critical reevaluation during its acclaimed second and third seasons, with many critics referring to The Leftovers as one of the greatest television series of all time, with particular praise for its writing, directing, acting (particularly Theroux's and Coon's) and thematic depth. The musical score composed by Max Richter also attracted critical praise. Despite receiving average Nielsen ratings throughout its run, the series has developed a cult following. The series has been compared favorably to Lost, a previous series co-created by Lindelof.

== Premise ==
The Leftovers starts three years after a global event called the "Sudden Departure", the inexplicable, simultaneous disappearance of 140 million people, 2% of the world's population, on October 14, 2011. Following that event, mainstream religions declined, and a number of cults emerged, most notably the Guilty Remnant, a group of white-clothed, chain-smoking nihilists, and a cult led by Holy Wayne, a man who views himself as the Second Coming of Jesus Christ.

The first season revolves around the Garvey family and their acquaintances in a fictionalized version of the town of Mapleton, New York. Kevin Garvey Jr. is the chief of police. His wife, Laurie, has joined the Guilty Remnant. Their son, Tommy, has left home to become a follower of Holy Wayne, and their daughter, Jill, is acting out. Meanwhile, grieving widow Nora Durst and her brother, Reverend Matt Jamison, struggle to deal with their respective traumas while adjusting to life post-Departure. It also follows Meg Abbott, a woman who is slowly seduced by the Mapleton faction of the Guilty Remnant, led by Patti Levin. These characters' lives intertwine and collide as they find themselves in the middle of an ongoing conflict between the Guilty Remnant and the townspeople of Mapleton.

In the second season, the location shifts from Mapleton to the fictional town of Jarden, Texas, where not a single citizen was lost in the Sudden Departure. The Murphy family becomes a key focal point of the season. The patriarch, John, is the chief firefighter of the town, also acting as a vigilante deterrent of people exploiting Jarden's "miracle". His wife, Erika, is a doctor. Their son, Michael, is an aspiring pastor and their daughter, Evie, is a high school student with epilepsy. The Garvey family, Nora, and Matt move to Jarden at a time which coincides with an incident that leads to the disappearance of three young girls, followed by mass panic and chaos that threatens the town's safety and forces the Garvey and Murphy families to confront their inner demons.

The third and final season unfolds three years later, in 2018, starting 14 days before the seventh anniversary of the Sudden Departure. The setting of the third season moves between Jarden and Victoria, Australia, as most of the lead characters—particularly the Garvey and Murphy families—undergo emotional journeys that make them reflect upon their lives, their beliefs, and the events they have encountered in the previous two seasons. Kevin's father, the mentally ill former chief of police of Mapleton, is also a main focus in the final season as he embarks on a spiritual journey to fulfill a cryptic purpose, and eventually crosses paths with the other members of the Murphy and Garvey families.

== Cast and characters ==
=== Main ===
- Justin Theroux as Kevin Garvey, initially Mapleton's chief of police and a father of two, who is trying to maintain a semblance of normalcy after the Sudden Departure.
- Amy Brenneman as Lorelei "Laurie" Garvey, Kevin's wife, who left her life behind to join a mysterious cult called the Guilty Remnant.
- Christopher Eccleston as Matt Jamison, a Reverend and editor of a self-published tabloid that outs sinners. He later relocates to Jarden, Texas and takes over its church.
- Liv Tyler as Megan "Meg" Abbott, (Note: In season 3, they are only credited with the main cast in the episodes in which they appear.) a woman who becomes involved with the Guilty Remnant and comes to lead its more radical faction.
- Chris Zylka as Tom "Tommy" Garvey, Laurie's son (whom Kevin has raised as his own), who takes refuge with a mysterious guru called "Holy Wayne", before starting an alternative cult with Laurie.
- Margaret Qualley as Jill Garvey, Kevin and Laurie's teenage daughter, a straight-A student who has a difficult relationship with her father.
- Carrie Coon as Nora Durst, a wife and mother who lost her husband, son and daughter in the Sudden Departure. She is Matt's sister, and later becomes Kevin's partner and the adoptive mother of Lily, an infant fathered by Holy Wayne.
- Emily Meade as Aimee (season 1), Jill's free-spirited high school friend, who lives with the Garveys in Mapleton.
- Amanda Warren as Lucy Warburton (season 1), Mapleton's mayor who struggles to appease the local community amidst frequent clashes with the Guilty Remnant. She was in a relationship with Kevin's father prior to the Sudden Departure and continues to visit him while he is in psychiatric care.
- Ann Dowd as Patricia "Patti" Levin, (Note: Dowd only appears in one episode of season three, although credited as a main cast member.) the leader of the Mapleton chapter of the Guilty Remnant, who continues to haunt Kevin following her death.
- Michael Gaston as Dean (season 1; guest season 3), a mysterious man who hunts dogs across Mapleton, and accompanies Kevin during his various sleepwalking nights.
- Max Carver as Adam Frost (season 1), a friend of Jill and Aimee.
- Charlie Carver as Scott Frost (season 1), Adam's identical twin brother.
- Annie Q. as Christine (season 1; guest season 3), one of Holy Wayne's former "groupies" who bears one of his children and is subsequently placed under Tommy's protection.
- Janel Moloney as Mary Jamison (seasons 2–3; recurring season 1), Matt's wife, who was rendered catatonic by a car crash during the Sudden Departure.
- Regina King as Erika Murphy (seasons 2–3), (Note: King only appears in one episode of season three, although credited as a main cast member.) a doctor who runs an urgent-care facility. The Murphys are the Garveys' neighbors in Jarden.
- Kevin Carroll as John Murphy (seasons 2–3), Erika's husband and head of Jarden's volunteer fire department. He subsequently marries Laurie, and operates as a fraudulent medium.
- Jovan Adepo as Michael Murphy (seasons 2–3), Erika and John's devout teenage son.
- Scott Glenn as Kevin Garvey Sr. (season 3; recurring season 1; guest season 2), Kevin's father and Mapleton's former chief of police, who relocates to Australia following his release from a mental health institute.

=== Recurring ===
- Paterson Joseph as Henry "Holy Wayne" Gilchrest Jr. (season 1; guest season 2), a post-Sudden Departure savior who "heals" people of their burdens.
- Natalie Gold as Sam's Mother (season 1; guest season 3), a woman who lost her baby son in the Sudden Departure.
- Marceline Hugot as Gladys (season 1; guest season 2), a member of the Guilty Remnant.
- Frank Harts as Officer Dennis Luckey (season 1), Kevin's deputy in Mapleton.
- Wayne Duvall as Detective Louis Vitello (season 1), a belligerent officer in the Mapleton police force who frequently clashes with Kevin.
- Jasmin Savoy Brown as Evangeline "Evie" Murphy (seasons 2–3), Erika and John's teenage daughter and Michael's twin sister.
- Darius McCrary as Isaac Rayney (season 2), a fortune teller in Jarden who is old friends with John.
- Steven Williams as Virgil (season 2), Evie and Michael's estranged grandfather. He serves as Kevin's guide during his first visit to the afterworld.
- Turk Pipkin as Edward/Pillar Man (season 2; guest season 3), a mysterious figure residing atop the pillar in Jarden Square.
- Kenneth Wayne Bradley as Ranger Bob (season 2)
- Lindsay Duncan as Grace Playford (season 3), a former missionary who lost her entire family and crosses paths with Kevin Sr.
- Damien Garvey as Kevin Yarborough (season 3), an Australian police chief.
- Katja Herbers as Dr. Eden (season 3), one of the scientists experimenting with a machine purported to reunite its test subjects with the Departed.
- Victoria Haralabidou as Dr. Bekker (season 3), one of the scientists experimenting with a machine purported to reunite its test subjects with the Departed.

=== Guests ===
- Brad Leland as Congressman Witten (season 1), a newly recruited follower of Holy Wayne's cult.
- David Turner as Anthony (season 1)
- Victor Williams as Ron Jensen, a banker in Mapleton who handles the foreclosure of Matt's church. (season 1)
- Sebastian Arcelus as Doug Durst (season 1), Nora's husband who departed with their two children.
- Billy Magnussen as Marcus (season 1), an employee at a business that creates lifelike mannequins of the Departed, who Nora meets at a conference in New York City.
- Tom Noonan as Casper (season 1), one of Holy Wayne's followers who Nora encounters in New York City.
- Bill Heck as Darren (seasons 1–2), Meg's ex-fiancée.
- Dominic Burgess as Dr. Brian Goodheart (season 2), an Australian scientist who illegally collects water from a reservoir in Jarden. He is one of the first people accused of being involved in the disappearance of three teenage girls due to his appearance and proximity to them on the day.
- Mark Linn-Baker as himself (seasons 2–3), an actor who faked his Departure after his co-stars from Perfect Strangers disappeared during the incident without him.
- Brad Greenquist as an adoption agent (season 2) who officiates Kevin and Nora's adoption of Lily.
- Charlayne Woodard as Lois Makepeace (season 2)
- Roger Narayan as Bhagat (season 2)
- Heather Kafka as Susan (season 2), a former member of the Guilty Remnant who joins Laurie's therapy group for ex-GR members.
- Mark Harelik as Peter (season 2), a publisher interested in Laurie's book.
- Alon Moni Aboutboul as Viktor (season 2)
- Sam Littlefield as Almer (season 2)
- Brett Butler as Sandy (seasons 2–3), the wife of Edward the pillar resident who lives in a shantytown outside Jarden.
- Joel Murray as George Brevity (seasons 2–3), an agent of the Department of Sudden Departures who befriends Nora in Jarden.
- Sonya Walger as Dr. Allison Herbert (season 2)
- Bill Camp as David Burton (seasons 2–3), an Australian former sportscaster who seemingly returned from the dead and now claims to be God. He appears to Kevin during his visits to the afterlife, and later meets Matt on the ferry between Tasmania and Melbourne.
- Gary Basaraba as Neil (season 2), Patti's husband
- Betty Buckley as Jane (season 2), Meg's mother, who died one day before the Sudden Departure.
- Adina Porter as a G.R. Leader (season 2) who disagrees with Meg's increasingly violent activism on behalf of the cult.
- Lasarus Ratuere as Officer Bardo (season 3)
- Jason Douglas as Jed (season 3)
- Alexandra Schepisi as The Woman (season 3)
- David Gulpilil as Christopher Sunday (season 3), a native elder living in the Australian outback who Kevin Sr. pursues for mystical knowledge.
- Benito Martinez as Arturo (season 3), a loyal member of Matt's congregation in Jarden.

== Development and production ==
HBO acquired rights for series development with Perrotta attached as writer/executive producer and Ron Yerxa and Albert Berger as executive producers in August 2011, shortly before the book came out.

Damon Lindelof had reportedly been a fan of Perrotta's earlier novels and had first learned of the book from a positive review by Stephen King in The New York Times in August 2011. In June 2012, Lindelof announced he would be developing the series alongside Perrotta. He served as the series' showrunner.

In February 2013, HBO ordered a pilot and, in September, ordered a 10-episode first season. The Leftovers is the first series HBO acquired from an outside studio that it did not produce in-house.

The first season covers the entirety of the book; the second and third seasons are completely original material. In April 2015, it was reported that the setting for the second season would shift from Mapleton, New York to a small town in Texas. The series shifted filming locations from New York to Austin, Texas, with nearby Lockhart serving as the main street of fictional Jarden, Texas, when principal photography commenced in late April. For the second season, which features several changes, including cast, location, and storylines; Lindelof cited The Wire and Friday Night Lights as influences.

The final season began principal photography in early May 2016, in Austin. In June 2016, the production moved to Melbourne, Victoria, Australia, where it filmed the remainder of the series and completed post-production. On the move to Melbourne, Lindelof said, "We're immensely grateful for the opportunity to try something that looks and feels different from the preceding seasons and we absolutely cannot wait to bring our story to its conclusion down under." It was also confirmed that the season would have a shortened 8-episode run.

=== Casting ===
In June 2013, casting announcements began. Justin Theroux, Liv Tyler, Christopher Eccleston, Ann Dowd, Amanda Warren, Michael Gaston, and Carrie Coon were announced to star in the pilot.

For the second season, eight of the 14 main cast members from season one returned, while Emily Meade, Amanda Warren, Annie Q., Max Carver, Charlie Carver and Michael Gaston did not. In April 2015, casting began for a family comprising ex-convict John Murphy; his hearing-impaired doctor wife, Erika; and their teenage children Evie, an outgoing athlete, and Michael, a pious Christian. The roles of John, Erika, and Michael are portrayed by Kevin Carroll, Regina King and Jovan Adepo, respectively, all as series regulars. Darius McCrary was cast in a recurring role as Isaac Rayney, John's friend and a palm reader. Steven Williams was cast in a recurring role, playing Virgil, a confidant of Kevin's. Janel Moloney, who had a recurring role in the first season as Mary Jamison, was promoted to a regular cast member in season two.

For the third season, it was confirmed in May 2016 that the entire main cast from the second season would return, with the exception of Dowd, and that Scott Glenn and Jasmin Savoy Brown had been promoted to series regulars. Glenn is credited as part of the main cast for the five season 3 episodes in which he appears; Brown ultimately remained as a recurring guest star, appearing in three episodes of the season. Lindsay Duncan joined the cast on December 6, 2016, also as a recurring guest star. Duncan appears in five episodes of the season.

Several cast members did not continue in a regular capacity during season 3, but retain main cast credit for the episodes in which they feature. Liv Tyler appears in one scene in the first episode, and returns for one subsequent appearance in episode 7. Ann Dowd also returns to the main cast in episode 7 only. Margaret Qualley appears in the season's first episode only, with one subsequent voice cameo. Regina King appears in episode 2 only, and Janel Moloney features in two episodes. Chris Zylka appears for the final time in episode 2, making only one subsequent voice cameo, but retains his credit as a main cast member for the entire season. Additionally, season 1 main cast members Michael Gaston and Annie Q. return as guest stars.

=== Opening credits and theme music ===
The main title from the first season uses "The Leftovers (Main Title Theme)", an original piece of music by composer Max Richter, accompanied by images like a fresco in the style of the Sistine Chapel. The second season uses "Let the Mystery Be" by Iris DeMent. In addition, the opening changes to one that shows images of pictures and people who were departed missing from them and in their place is various images of earth-related phenomena like rain, clouds, aurora borealis and lightning. Season 3 retains the opening from Season 2 but with a different theme song for each episode, including reprises of the Season 1 main title theme and "Let the Mystery Be" in episodes seven and eight respectively. This is because Damon Lindelof wants to "thematically introduce the episode to come" with different title music for each episode.

Season 3

1. None
2. "Nothing's Gonna Stop Me Now" (theme from Perfect Strangers) by David Pomeranz
3. "Personal Jesus" by Richard Cheese
4. "This Love Is Over" by Ray LaMontagne and the Pariah Dogs
5. "Ashrei" by Benzion Miller
6. "1-800 Suicide" by Gravediggaz
7. "The Leftovers (Main Title Theme)" by Max Richter
8. "Let the Mystery Be" by Iris DeMent

== Episodes ==
Season	Episodes	Originally released	
Season	Episodes	First released	Last released
1	10	June 29, 2014	September 7, 2014
2	10	October 4, 2015	December 6, 2015
3	8	April 16, 2017	June 4, 2017

== Reception ==
=== Critical response ===
==== Season 1 ====
Critical response of The Leftovers
Season	Rotten Tomatoes	Metacritic
1	82% (182 reviews)	65 (42 reviews)
2	94% (164 reviews)	80 (22 reviews)
3	99% (189 reviews)	98 (17 reviews)

The first season of The Leftovers received mostly positive reviews from critics. Metacritic scored season one 65 out of 100, based on 42 critics, indicating "generally favorable reviews". Rotten Tomatoes scored the season 82%, based on 182 reviews, with an average rating of 7.65/10. The site's critical consensus reads, "Its dour tone and self-seriousness may make for somber viewing, but The Leftovers is an artfully crafted, thought-provoking drama that aims high and often hits its mark." IGN reviewer Matt Fowler gave consistently high scores to all the season one episodes, including two perfect 10 scores for "Two Boats and a Helicopter" and the season finale "The Prodigal Son Returns." He then gave the entire first season a review score of 9.4 out of 10, particularly praising the character-centric episodes, Max Richter's score and the performances, particularly Carrie Coon's.

==== Season 2 ====
The second season received critical acclaim. On Metacritic, it has a score of 80 out of 100 based on 22 reviews, indicating "generally favorable reviews". Rotten Tomatoes gave the second season a rating of 94% with an average score of 8.8/10 based on 164 critic reviews, with the critical consensus "The Leftovers continues to be unpredictable and provocative in season two with its new location, though the inexplicable circumstances will still frustrate many viewers." Alan Sepinwall of HitFix gave it an "A" grade and wrote that "The Leftovers is still TV's best drama as season 2 begins"; it has "tighter focus, but same powerful, immersive experience". In her five out of five star review, Emily St. James of Vox wrote: "It's a show that wants to provoke a reaction in you, whether it's admiration, hatred, or just bafflement. It's HBO's best drama—and thus must-see TV."

==== Season 3 ====
The third and final season received unanimous acclaim from critics. On Metacritic, it has a score of 98 out of 100 based on 17 reviews, indicating "universal acclaim". On Rotten Tomatoes, it has a 99% rating with an average score of 9.35/10 based on 189 reviews. The site's critical consensus reads, "With reliably ambitious storytelling and outstanding performances from its cast, Season 3 of The Leftovers approaches the series' conclusion as thoughtfully, purposefully, and confidently as it began." Maureen Ryan of Variety wrote the final season "is spectacular, in every sense of that word." The Leftovers was ranked as the best TV series of 2017 according to Metacritic. Alan Sepinwall placed season three first on his list of the best TV shows of 2017, an accolade he had awarded to both previous seasons in their respective years. He said "this has been my show of the year — of the decade, maybe, depending on how we count things like Mad Men and Breaking Bad that debuted in the '00s"; he went on to say "the eight-episode final season was a miracle".

According to Metacritic's aggregate of critics' decade-end lists, The Leftovers was the fifth-highest ranked show of the 2010s.

=== Critics' top ten lists ===
2014
- No. 1 HitFix
- No. 4 IGN
- No. 5 IndieWire
- No. 7 Yahoo! TV
- No. 8 Digital Spy
- No. 8 Vox
- No. 8 We Got This Covered
- – The Globe and Mail

2015
- No. 1 HitFix
- No. 1 IndieWire
- No. 1 IGN
- No. 1 Rapid City Journal
- No. 1 ScreenCrush
- No. 1 The Star-Ledger
- No. 1 Thompson on Hollywood
- No. 2 Cinema Blend
- No. 2 Complex
- No. 2 The Hollywood Reporter
- No. 2 Lincoln Journal Star
- No. 2 The Playlist
- No. 2 Vox
- No. 3 The Daily Beast
- No. 3 Philadelphia Daily News
- No. 3 TV Fanatic
- No. 3 We Got This Covered
- No. 4 Adweek
- No. 5 Salon
- No. 6 The A.V. Club
- No. 6 Omaha World-Herald
- No. 6 Paste
- No. 6 TV.com
- No. 8 TIME
- No. 9 RogerEbert.com
- No. 9 Vulture
- - The Atlantic
- - Flavorwire
- - The New York Times
- - Variety
- - The Week

2017
- No. 1 Indiewire
- No. 1 Paste
- No. 1 New York Observer
- No. 1 Slant Magazine
- No. 1 Uproxx
- No. 1 TVLine
- No. 1 Variety
- No. 2 The Village Voice
- No. 2 IGN
- No. 2 Matt Zoller Seitz of Vulture
- No. 3 The Ringer
- No. 3 Rolling Stone
- No. 3 TIME
- No. 4 TV Guide
- No. 4 Yahoo!
- - The New York Times

2010s
- No. 1 The Detroit News
- No. 1 Entertainment Weekly
- No. 1 IndieWire
- No. 1 Rolling Stone
- No. 1 Salon
- No. 1 Variety
- No. 2 ScreenCrush
- No. 2 USA Today
- No. 3 TV Guide
- No. 4 RogerEbert.com
- No. 7 The A.V. Club
- No. 8 The Hollywood Reporter
- No. 9 Slant
- - Time
- - Uproxx

=== Accolades ===
Award	Year	Category	Nominee(s)	Result	Ref.
Critics' Choice Television Awards	2014	Most Exciting New Series	The Leftovers	Won	
Critics' Choice Television Awards	2015	Best Supporting Actor in a Drama Series	Christopher Eccleston	Nominated	
Critics' Choice Television Awards	2015	Best Supporting Actress in a Drama Series	Carrie Coon	Nominated	
Critics' Choice Television Awards	2016	Best Actor in a Drama Series	Justin Theroux	Nominated	
Critics' Choice Television Awards	2016	Best Actress in a Drama Series	Carrie Coon	Won	
Critics' Choice Television Awards	2016	Best Drama Series	The Leftovers	Nominated	
Critics' Choice Television Awards	2016	Best Supporting Actor in a Drama Series	Christopher Eccleston	Nominated	
Critics' Choice Television Awards	2016	Best Supporting Actress in a Drama Series	Ann Dowd	Nominated	
Critics' Choice Television Awards	2016	Best Supporting Actress in a Drama Series	Regina King	Nominated	
Dorian Awards	2018	Unsung TV Show of the Year	The Leftovers	Nominated	
Hollywood Music in Media Awards	2014	Best Main Title – TV Show/Digital Streaming Series	Max Richter	Won	
Hollywood Music in Media Awards	2014	Outstanding Music Supervision – Television	Liza Richardson	Nominated	
International Film Music Critics Awards	2015	Best Original Score for a Drama Series	Max Richter	Nominated	
Primetime Emmy Awards	2017	Outstanding Guest Actress in a Drama Series	Ann Dowd (for "The Most Powerful Man in the World (and His Identical Twin Brother)")	Nominated	
Satellite Awards	2015	Best Genre Series	The Leftovers	Nominated	
Satellite Awards	2015	Best Supporting Actor for a Series, Miniseries, or TV Film	Christopher Eccleston	Nominated	
Satellite Awards	2015	Best Supporting Actress for a Series, Miniseries, or TV Film	Ann Dowd	Nominated	
Satellite Awards	2016	Best Genre Series	The Leftovers	Nominated	
Satellite Awards	2018	Best Actress in a Drama / Genre Series	Carrie Coon	Nominated	
Satellite Awards	2018	Best Genre Series	The Leftovers	Nominated	
Satellite Awards	2018	Best Supporting Actor for a Series, Miniseries, or TV Film	Christopher Eccleston	Nominated	
Television Critics Association Awards	2016	Outstanding Achievement in Drama	The Leftovers	Nominated	
Television Critics Association Awards	2017	Individual Achievement in Drama	Carrie Coon (for The Leftovers and Fargo)	Won	
Television Critics Association Awards	2017	Program of the Year	The Leftovers	Nominated	
USC Scripter Awards	2016	Outstanding Writing – Television	Damon Lindelof and Jacqueline Hoyt (for "Axis Mundi")	Nominated	
Writers Guild of America Awards	2015	Long Form Adapted	Damon Lindelof and Tom Perrotta (for "Pilot")	Nominated	
Writers Guild of America Awards	2016	Episodic Drama	Damon Lindelof and Nick Cuse (for "International Assassin")	Nominated	
Writers Guild of America Awards	2018	Episodic Drama	Tom Perrotta, Damon Lindelof, and Tom Spezialy (for "The Book of Nora")	Nominated	

== Home media ==
The first season was released on Blu-ray and DVD in region 1 on October 6, 2015. The set contains two audio commentaries and four behind-the-scenes featurettes. The second season was released on Blu-ray and DVD on February 9, 2016. The third season's DVD format was released on October 10, 2017, while the Blu-ray format was released by the Warner Archive Collection.
