= Golden Globe Award for Best Actress =

Golden Globe Award for Best Actress can refer to:

- Golden Globe Award for Best Actress – Miniseries or Television Film,
- Golden Globe Award for Best Actress – Motion Picture Drama,
- Golden Globe Award for Best Actress – Motion Picture Musical or Comedy,
- Golden Globe Award for Best Actress – Television Series Drama, or
- Golden Globe Award for Best Actress – Television Series Musical or Comedy
