= Golden Globe Award for Best Actress – Musical or Comedy =

Golden Globe Award for Best Actress – Musical or Comedy may refer to:

- Golden Globe Award for Best Actress – Motion Picture Musical or Comedy, the award that honors the best lead actresses in a motion picture musical or comedy
- Golden Globe Award for Best Actress – Television Series Musical or Comedy, the award that honors the best lead actresses in a television series musical or comedy
