= Brett Butler (actress) =

American actress (born 1958)

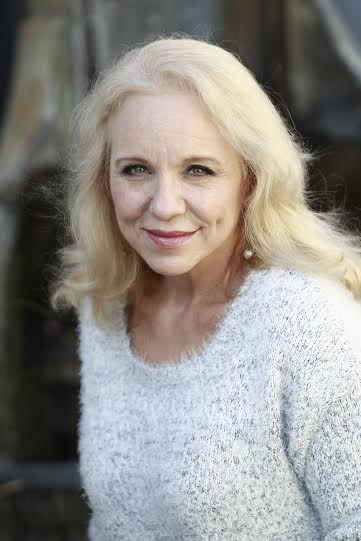
- Butler in 2015
- Born: Brett Anderson; January 30, 1958 (age 68); Montgomery, Alabama, U.S.
- Education: University of Georgia
- Occupations: Actress; writer; comedian
- Years active: 1987–present
- Spouses: Charles Michael Wilson (m. 1978; div. 1981) Ken Zieger (m. 1987; div. 1999)

Brett Butler (born Brett Anderson; January 30, 1958) is an American actress, writer, and stand-up comedian. Butler gained recognition as a stand-up comedian, performing in clubs across the United States and making appearances on The Tonight Show Starring Johnny Carson and The Tonight Show with Jay Leno. She is, however, best known for playing the title role in the ABC comedy series Grace Under Fire (1993–1998), for which she received two Golden Globe Awards nominations. She has also had guest appearances on various series, including My Name Is Earl and Anger Management.

== Life and career ==
=== Early life ===
Butler was born Brett Anderson in Montgomery, Alabama, the eldest of five sisters. She was four years old when her father, Roland Decatur Anderson Jr., an oil company executive, moved the family to Houston, Texas. Her mother Carol left Roland, an abusive alcoholic, and moved with their children to Miami, Florida. Her mother battled depression, and the family was sometimes so poor that they ate Tootsie Rolls for dinner. Butler briefly attended the University of Georgia. Before experiencing success as a stand-up comic, she worked as a cocktail waitress.

In 1978, at the age of 20, Butler married her first husband, Charles Michael Wilson, three months after their meeting. Wilson was abusive and in 1981 she left him. Since then, he has both admitted and adamantly denied battering Butler, while claiming that she too was violent. Butler returned to her mother in Miami and began performing in comedy clubs, settling on the stage name "Brett Butler" as a play on the southern U.S. Gone With the Wind character of Rhett Butler. She moved to New York City in 1984, and was arrested for possession of marijuana. In New York, she met her second husband, Ken Zieger, and they were married in 1987.

In 1987, Butler made her television debut on The Tonight Show. Also that year, she performed on Dolly Parton's short-lived variety series, Dolly. Parton hired Butler as a writer for the remainder of the show's season, but the series was canceled after one season of lackluster ratings.

=== Grace Under Fire and beyond ===
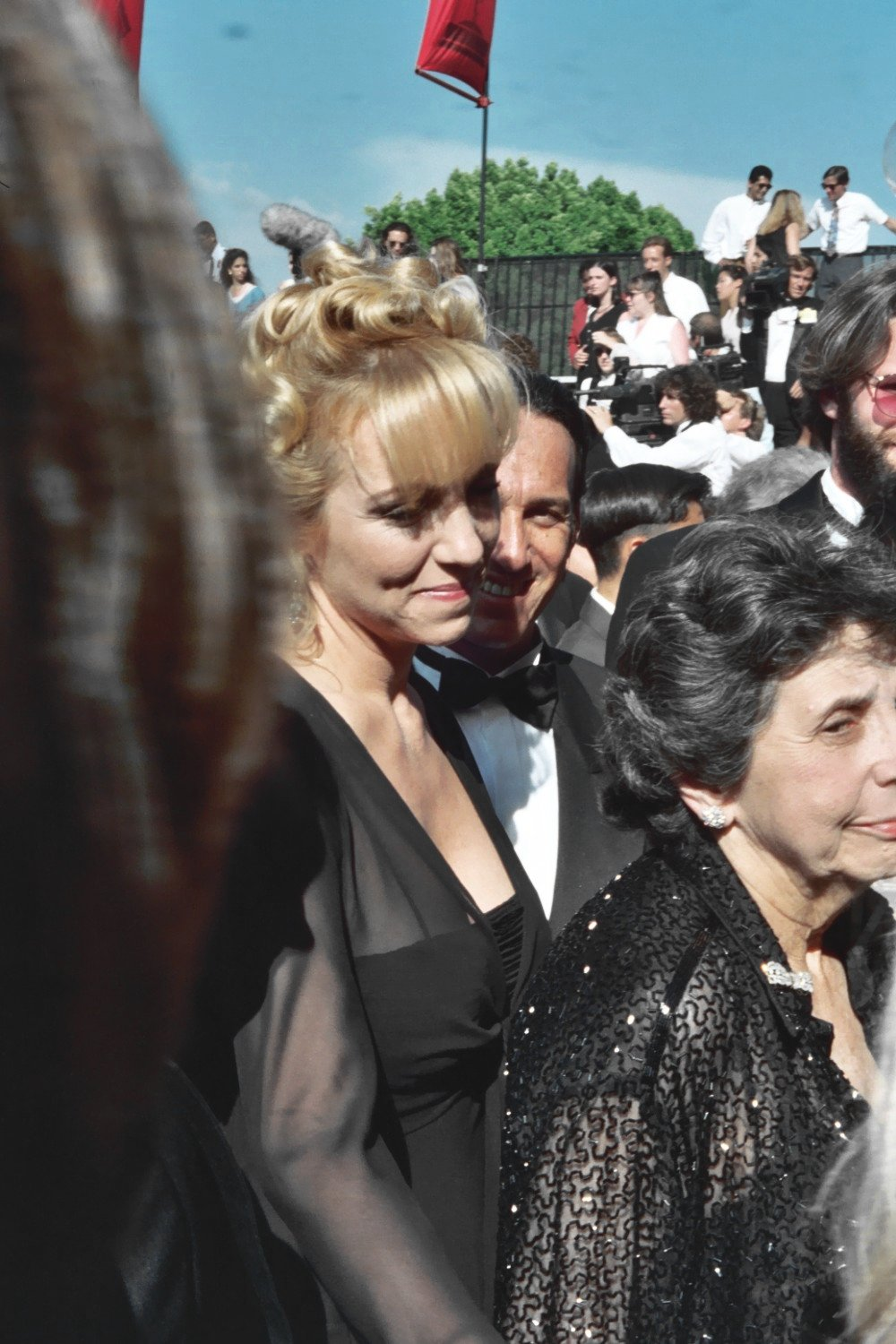
Butler at the 1994 Emmy Awards

In 1993, Butler starred in the ABC comedy series Grace Under Fire, created by Chuck Lorre. Butler starred as Grace Kelly, a divorced single mother and recovering alcoholic. The show begins after the main character divorces her abusive alcoholic husband of eight years in an attempt to start life anew and prevent her children from making the same mistakes she did. For her performance, Butler received two Golden Globe nominations for Best Actress – Television Series Musical or Comedy in 1995 and 1997, and won a People's Choice Award for Favorite Female Performer in 1994. She reprised her role of Grace Kelly in The Drew Carey Show and Ellen in 1997.

Butler published her memoir, Knee Deep in Paradise, in 1996. The book was started before attaining her celebrity status, and candidly addresses much of this time, ending the autobiography before Grace Under Fire's debut.

Behind the scenes, Butler battled a recurring drug addiction and spent time in rehab. In February 1998, due to her erratic behavior stemming from substance abuse, she was dismissed from the show and ABC cancelled the series. After Grace was cancelled in 1998, Butler moved from Los Angeles to a farm in Rome, Georgia. In the following years she made selected screen appearances in the films Bruno (2000) and Mrs. Harris (2005), and guest-starred on an episode of the NBC sitcom My Name Is Earl in 2005. In 2008, Butler headlined at an arts fundraiser and spoke freely with a reporter about her depression, past drug addiction, television work, and current life on the farm. She also expressed interest in writing another book.

=== Return to acting ===
In October 2011, Butler appeared on The Rosie Show and reported being sober since 1998. According to an Entertainment Tonight interview at around the same time, Butler, unable to maintain the costs of her farm, had lived in a homeless shelter, though in a 2021 Hollywood Reporter profile, Butler denied that she was ever homeless, and said she was paid to fabricate this claim for the show. By this time Butler was attempting to make a career comeback and was working on developing a reality TV show about her self-professed psychic abilities and performing at the Downtown Comedy Club in Los Angeles.

In June 2012, Butler appeared in a recurring role on the CBS daytime soap opera The Young and the Restless playing ex-psychiatrist Tim Reid's girlfriend. She returned for two episodes in March 2015. Later in 2012, she began appearing in a recurring role as the bartender at the restaurant that Charlie Goodson (Charlie Sheen) frequents in the FX comedy series Anger Management. Butler appeared in a total of 38 episodes from 2012 to 2014. In 2016, she played herself in the comedy-drama film The Comedian starring Robert De Niro.

Later, Butler began appearing in dramatic roles. She guest-starred in two episodes of HBO drama series The Leftovers, and had a recurring role as Michaela's (Aja Naomi King) adoptive mother Trishelle in the ABC legal thriller How to Get Away with Murder in 2016. From 2018 to 2019, she played Tammy Rose Sutton in the AMC horror series, The Walking Dead. Also in 2019, she took a recurring role as Sandy Jackson, the mother of Reese Witherspoon's character in the Apple TV+ drama series, The Morning Show.

== Filmography ==
=== Film ===
| Year | Title | Role | Notes |
|---|---|---|---|
| 1993 | The Child Ain't Right | Herself | Showtime Stand-Up Comedy special |
| 1994 | Totally Bill Hicks | Herself | |
| 2000 | Bruno | Sister Della Rosa | |
| 2000 | Militia | Bobbi | |
| 2005 | Mrs. Harris | Tarnowner Ex No. 1 | Television film |
| 2005 | Vampire Bats | Shelly Beaudraux | |
| 2009 | Brett Butler Presents the Southern Belles of Comedy | Herself | |
| 2016 | The Comedian | Herself | |
| 2018 | Friday's Child | Ms. LeField | |

=== Television ===
| Year | Title | Role | Notes |
|---|---|---|---|
| 1988 | Dolly | Rhonda | Episode: "1.15" |
| 1993–1998 | Grace Under Fire | Grace Kelly | 112 episodes, also executive producer People's Choice Award for Favorite Female Performer in a New TV Series; Viewers for Quality Television Award for Best Actress in a Quality Comedy Series; Nominated—Golden Globe Award for Best Actress – Television Series Musical or Comedy (1995, 1997); Nominated—Viewers for Quality Television Award for Best Actress in a Quality Comedy Series (1994, 1996–97) |
| 1995 | Women of the House | Bre | Episode: "Women in Film" |
| 1995 | The Larry Sanders Show | Brett Butler | Episode: "I Was a Teenage Lesbian" |
| 1996 | Kino's Storytime | Herself | Episode: "Brett Butler" |
| 1997 | The Drew Carey Show | Grace Kelly | Episode: "Drew Gets Married" |
| 1997 | Ellen | Grace Kelly | Episode: "Secrets & Ellen" |
| 1997 | Coach | Barbara | Episode: "Viva Las Ratings" |
| 2005 | My Name Is Earl | Connie Darville | Episode: "White Lie Christmas" |
| 2006 | Moochers | Host | |
| 2012 | Archer | Trish | Episode: "Space Race – Part 2" |
| 2012 | The Young and the Restless | Beth Hortense | 9 episodes |
| 2012–2014 | Anger Management | Brett | 38 episodes |
| 2015–2017 | The Leftovers | Sandy | Episodes: "No Room at the Inn" + "Don't Be Ridiculous" |
| 2016 | How to Get Away with Murder | Trishelle Pratt | Episode 35: "It's About Frank"; Episode 36: "Is Someone Really Dead?"; Episode 39: "Who's Dead?" |
| 2018–2019 | The Walking Dead | Tammy Rose Sutton | 6 episodes |
| 2019 | The Morning Show | Sandy Jackson | 3 episodes |
| 2023 | Fantasy Island | Marcia | 1 episode (Season 2, Episode 4: “Mystery in Miami”) |
