= Knee Deep in Paradise =

1996 autobiography

- Author: Brett Bulter
- Language: English
- Genre: Autobiography
- Publication date: April 1996
- ISBN: 0-7868-8914-4

Knee Deep in Paradise is an autobiography authored by actor/comedian Brett Butler, released in 1996.

The book deals with her pre-stardom life before the success of her popular ABC sitcom Grace Under Fire.

Notable for its unflinching candor, Butler's book provides accounts of such tragic personal events as being abandoned by her father when she was 4 years old, being beaten by her husband, and the ubiquitous crutches of drinking, drugs and sex. It progresses to her discovery of stand-up comedy and how it helped to channel her creativity. She develops her career, sobers up, and discovers her true self.

It was published by Hyperion and is available in hardcover (ISBN 0-7868-8914-4), softcover (ISBN 0-7868-6136-3), and audiobook formats.
