= Golden Globe Award for Best Actress – Television Series Musical or Comedy =

Award that honors the best lead actresses in a television series musical or comedy

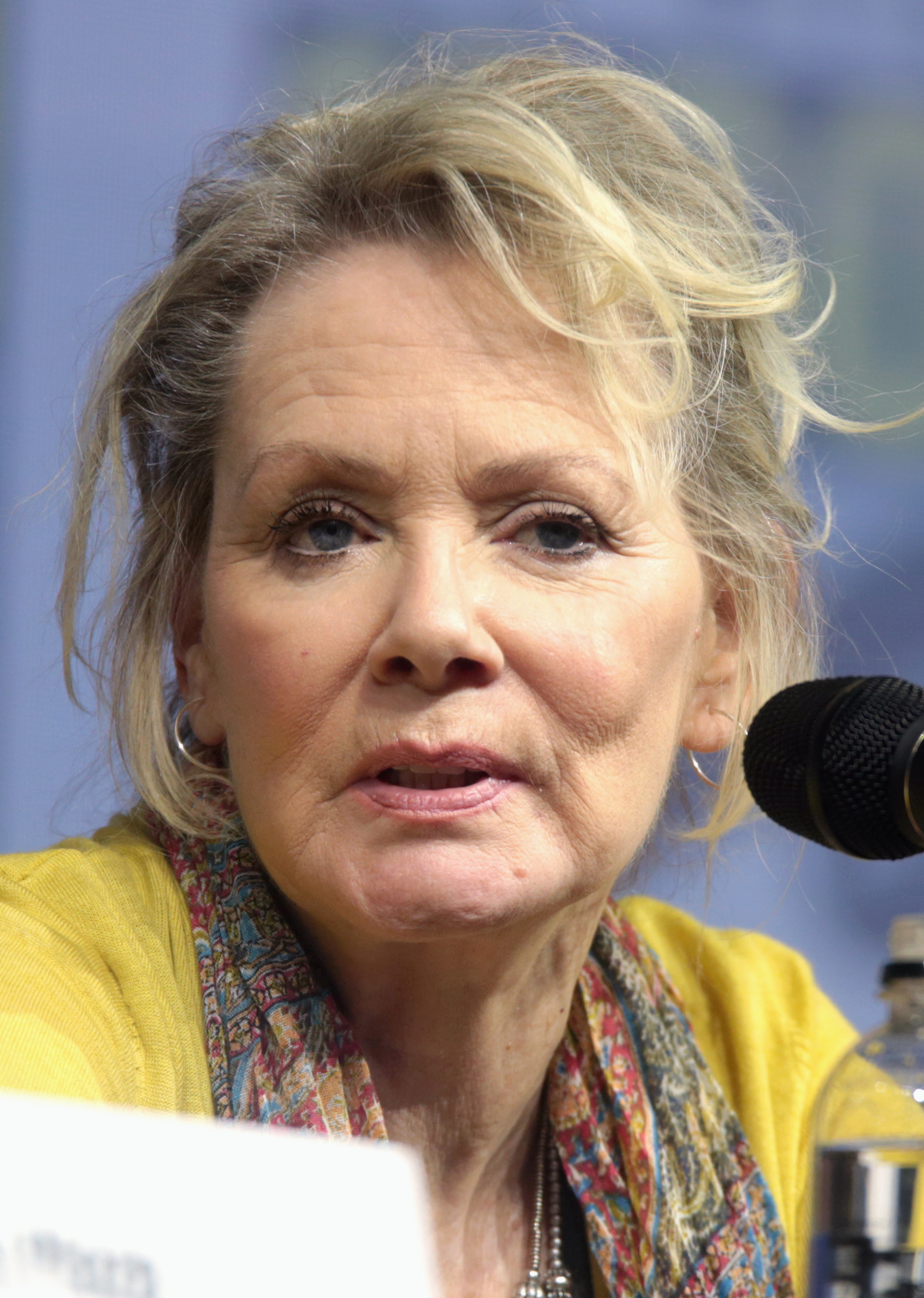
- The 2025 Recipient: Jean Smart
- Awarded for: Best Performance by an Actress in a Leading Role in a Television Series Musical or Comedy
- Country: United States
- Presented by: Hollywood Foreign Press Association
- First award: March 5, 1962
- Currently held by: Jean Smart, Hacks (2025)

Highlights
- Most awards: Carol Burnett (5)
- Most nominations: Carol Burnett (12)
- Website: goldenglobes.org

The Golden Globe Award for Best Actress – Television Series Musical or Comedy is a Golden Globe Award presented annually by the Hollywood Foreign Press Association (HFPA). It is given in honor of an actress who has delivered an outstanding performance in a leading role on a musical or comedy television series for the calendar year.

It was first awarded at the 19th Golden Globe Awards on March 5, 1962, under the title Best TV Star – Female, grouping all genres of television series, to Pauline Fredericks. The nominees for the award announced annually starting in 1963. The award initially honored actresses in both comedy and drama genres until 1969, when the award was split into categories that honored comedic and dramatic performances separately. It was presented under the new title Best TV Actress – Musical or Comedy and in 1980 under its current title.

Since its inception, the award has been given to 43 actresses. Jean Smart is the current recipient of the award for her role as Deborah Vance on Hacks. Carol Burnett has won the most awards in this category with five wins and received the most nominations at 12.

== Winners and nominees ==
Listed below are the winners of the award for each year, as well as the other nominees.

Key	Meaning
‡	Indicates the winning actor.

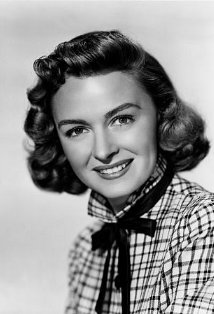
Donna Reed won for The Donna Reed Show in 1962.

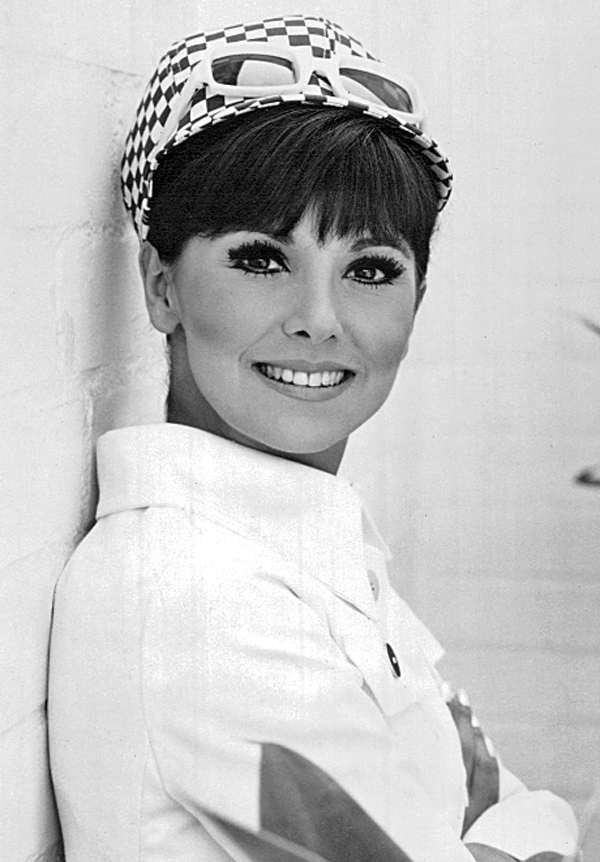
Marlo Thomas won for That Girl in 1966.

Mary Tyler Moore won twice in 1964 and 1970 for her roles in The Dick Van Dyke Show and The Mary Tyler Moore Show.

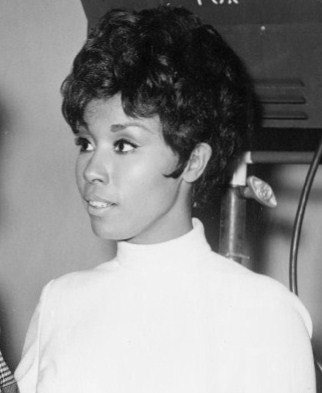
Diahann Carroll won for Julia in 1968.

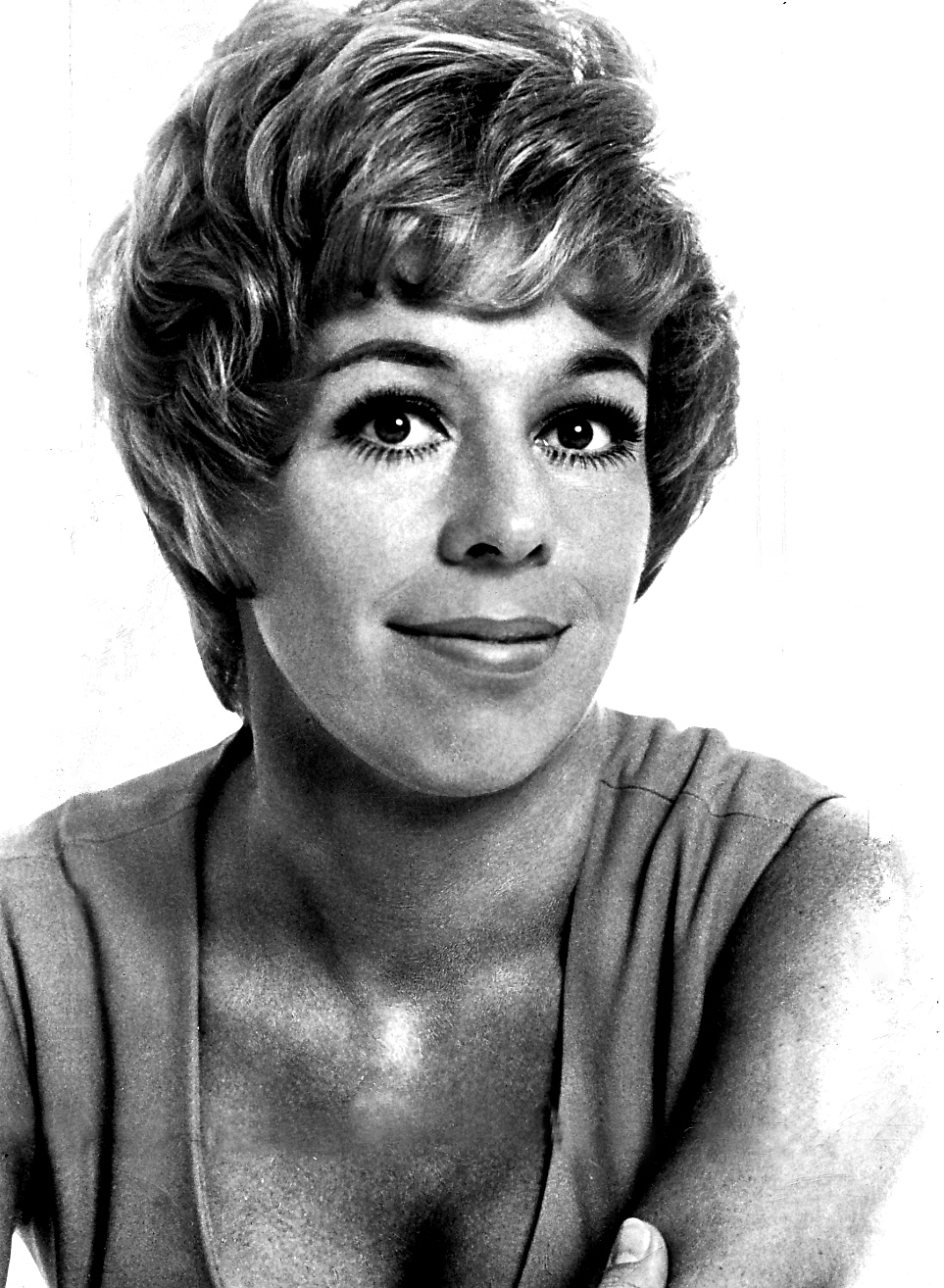
Carol Burnett won five times, the most wins in this category, for The Carol Burnett Show.

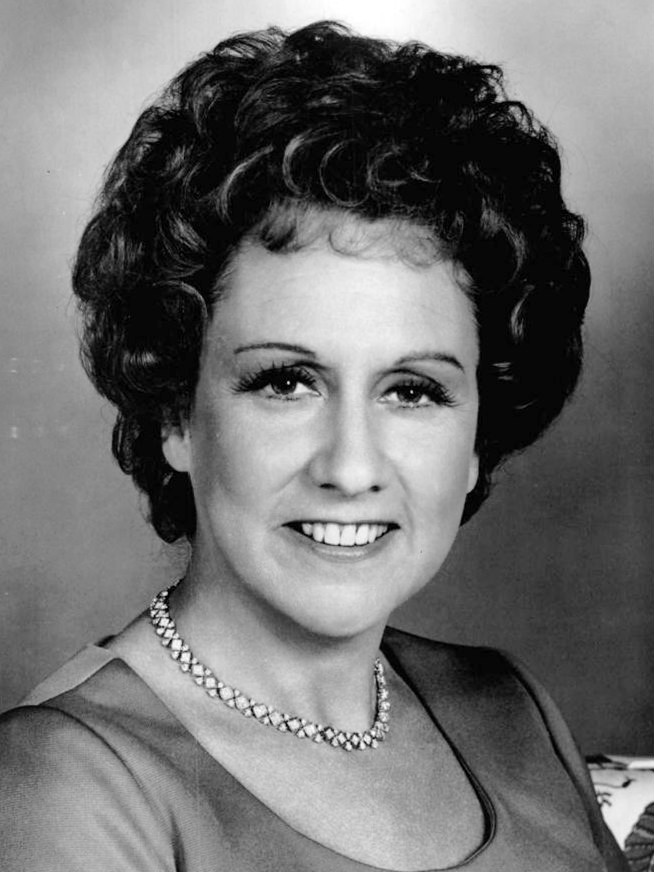
Jean Stapleton won twice playing Edith Bunker on All in the Family.

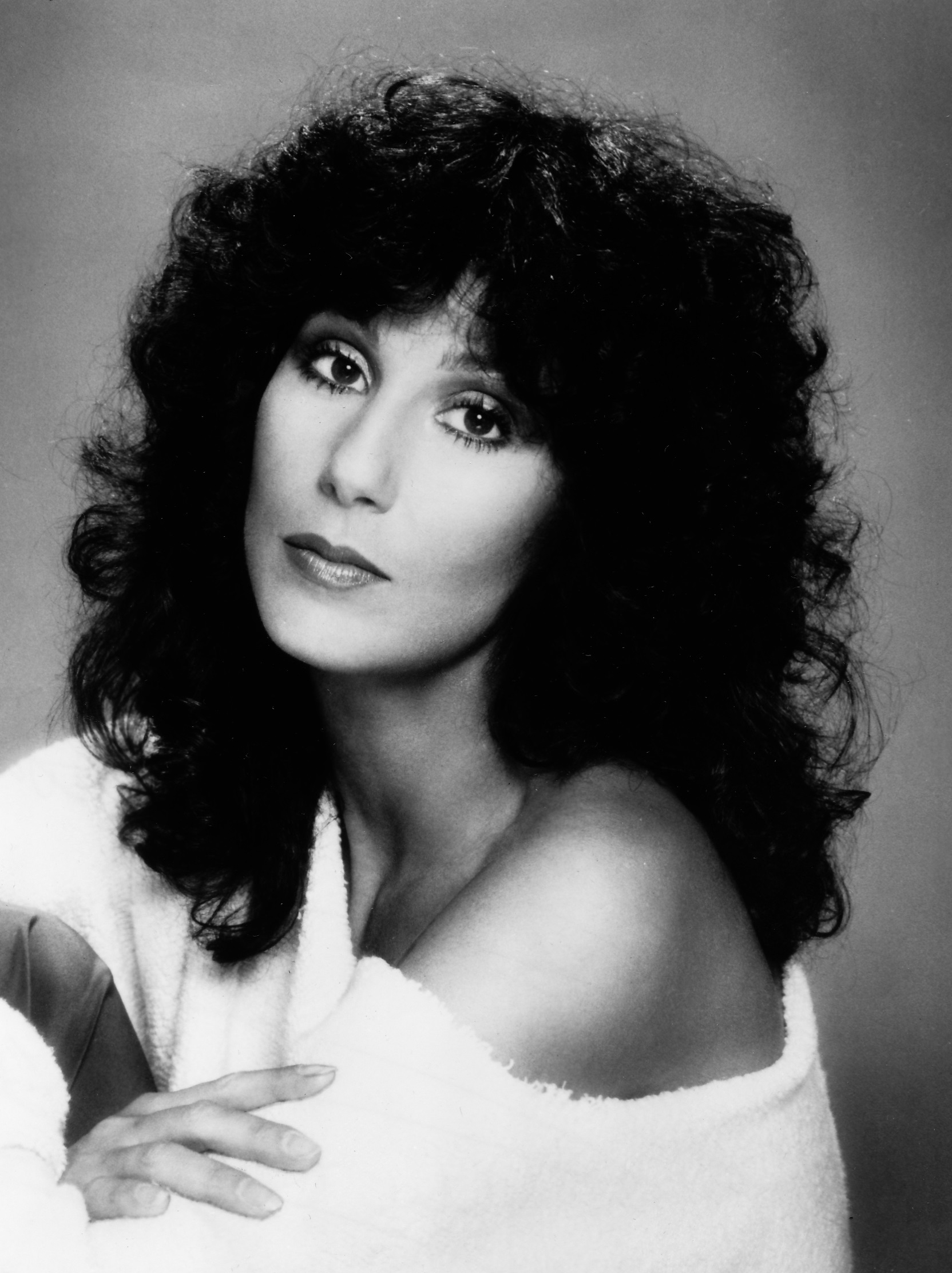
Cher won in 1973, tying with Jean Stapleton, for The Sonny & Cher Comedy Hour.

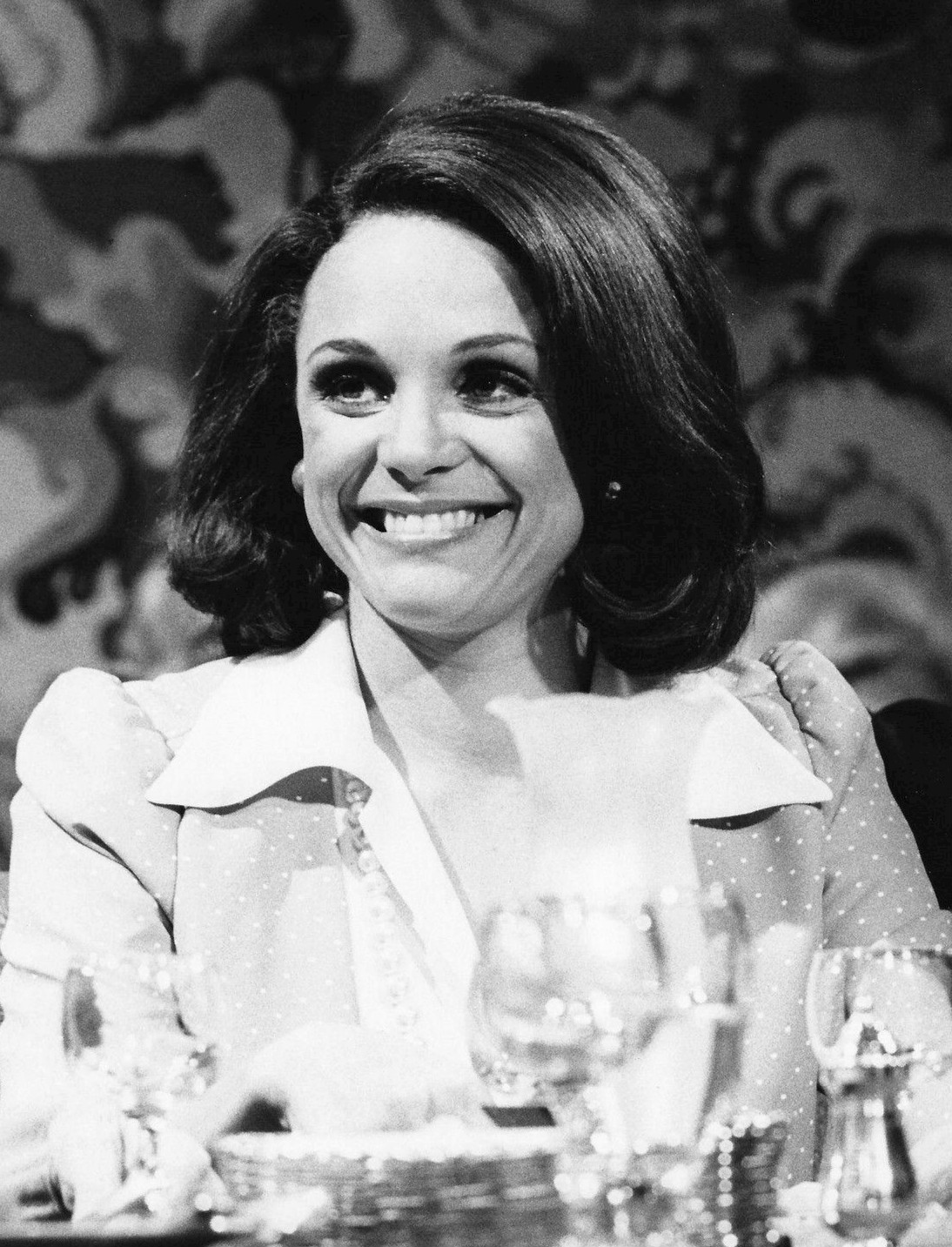
Valerie Harper won for Rhoda in 1974.

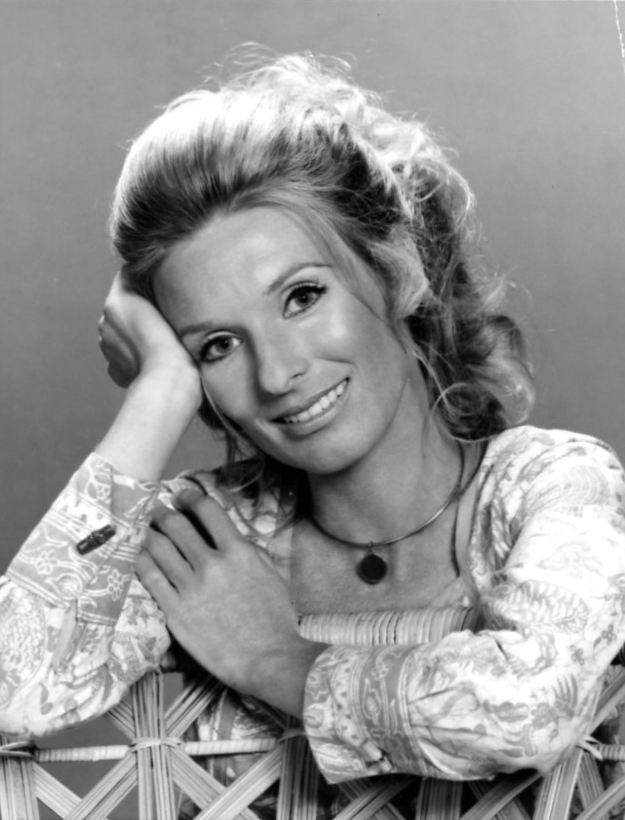
Cloris Leachman won playing Phyllis Lindstrom on Phyllis.

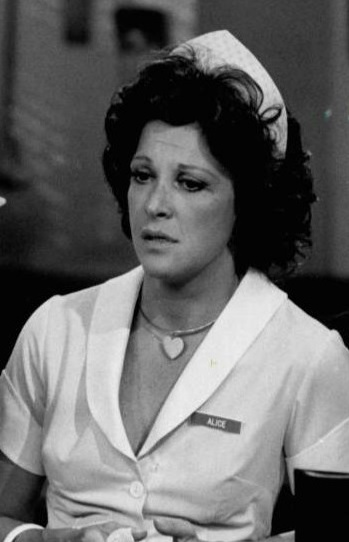
Linda Lavin won twice Alice.

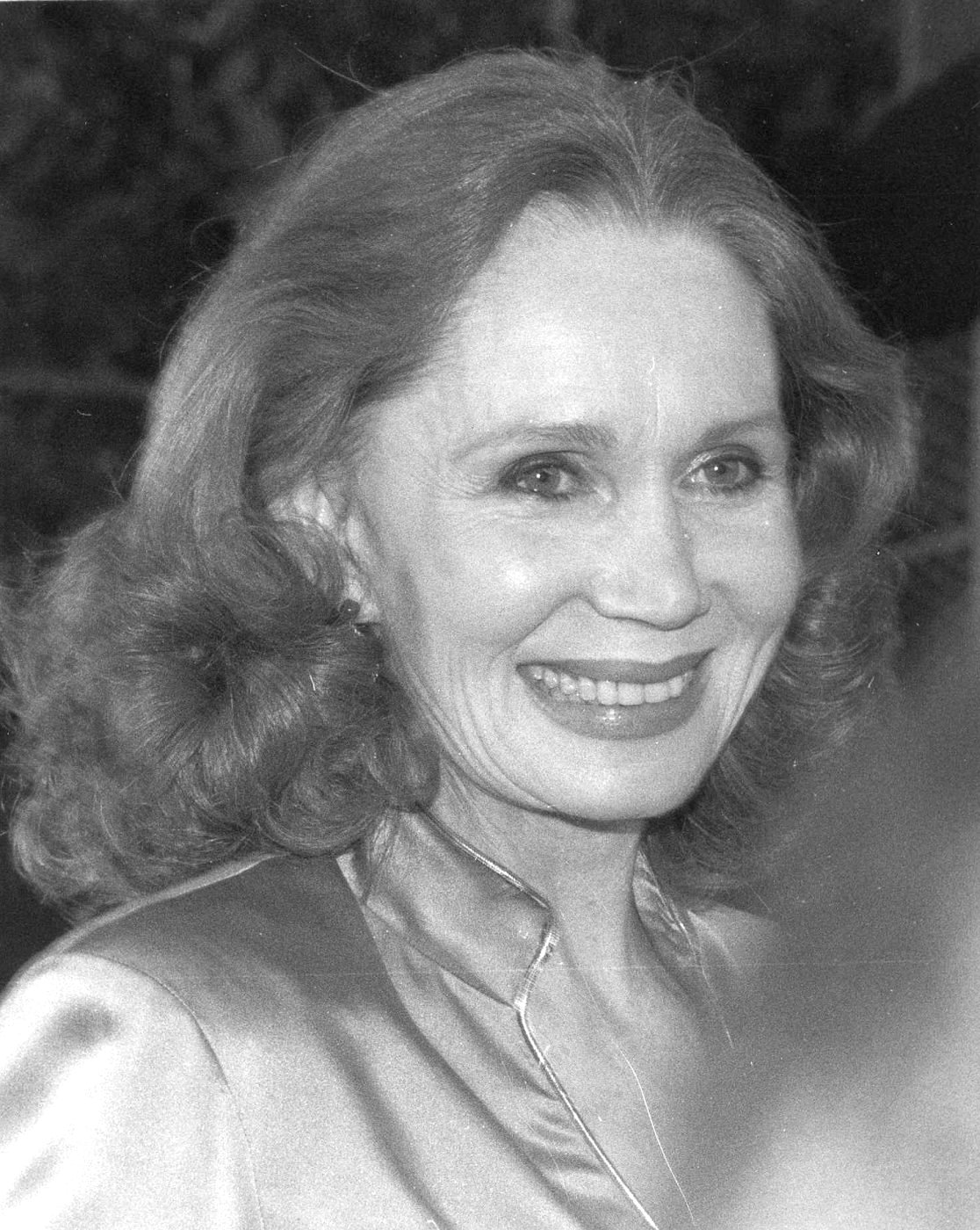
Katherine Helmond won for Soap in 1980.

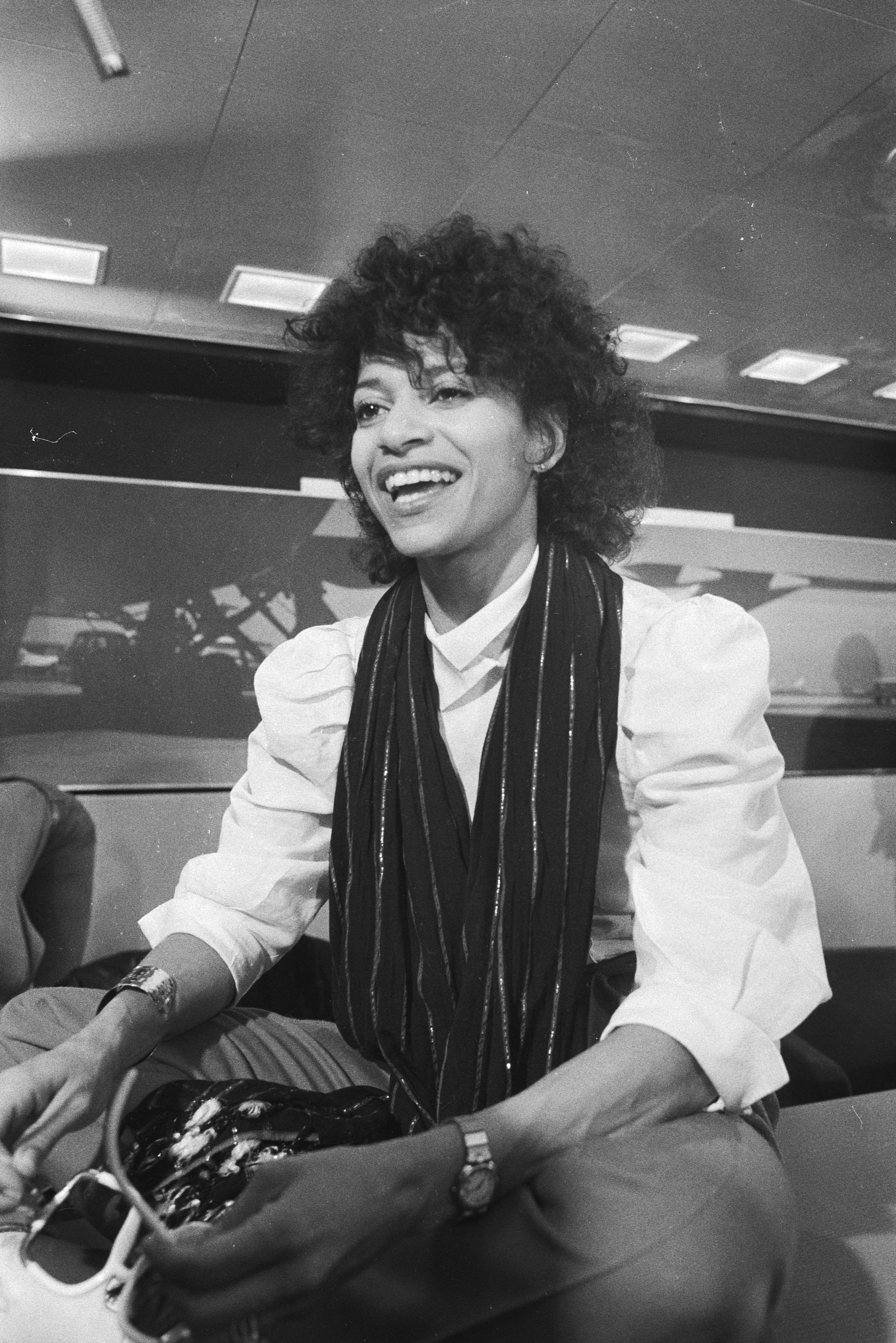
Debbie Allen won in 1982 for Fame.

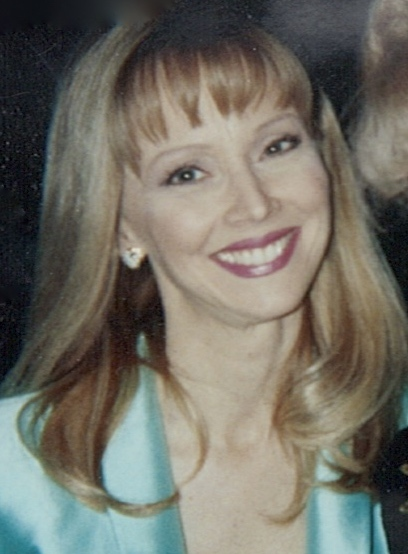
Shelley Long won for Cheers

Cybill Shepherd won thrice for Moonlighting and Cybill.

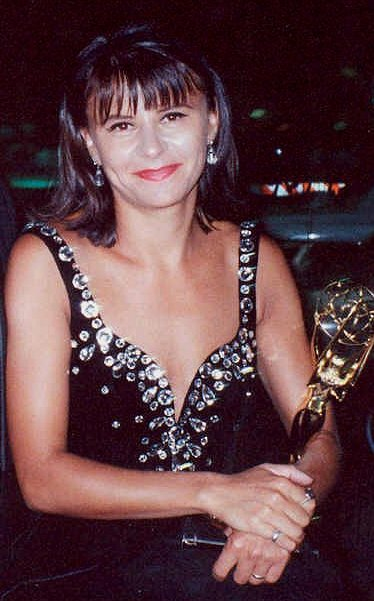
Tracey Ullman won for The Tracey Ullman Show.

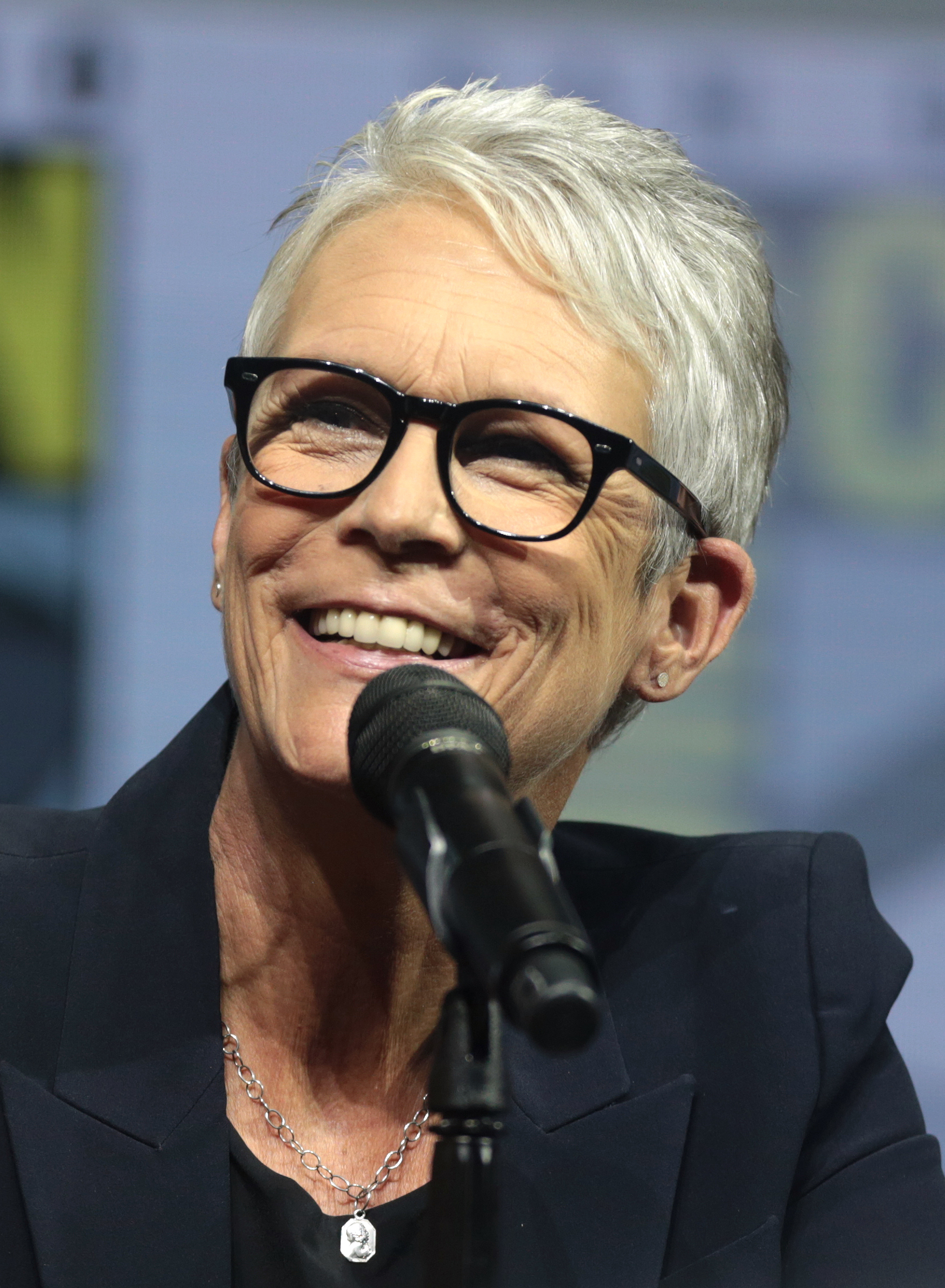
Jamie Lee Curtis won for Anything but Love in 1998.

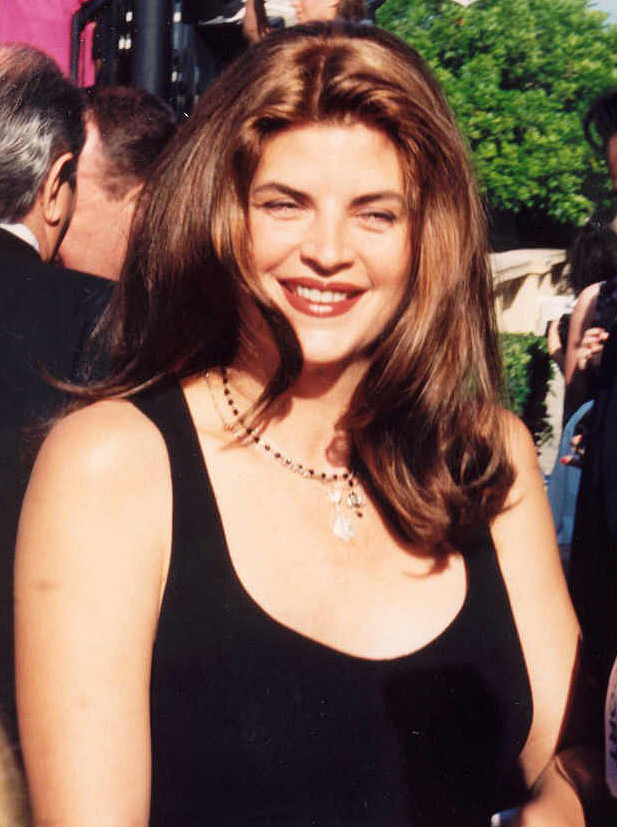
Kirstie Alley won for Rebecca Lowe on Cheers in 1990.

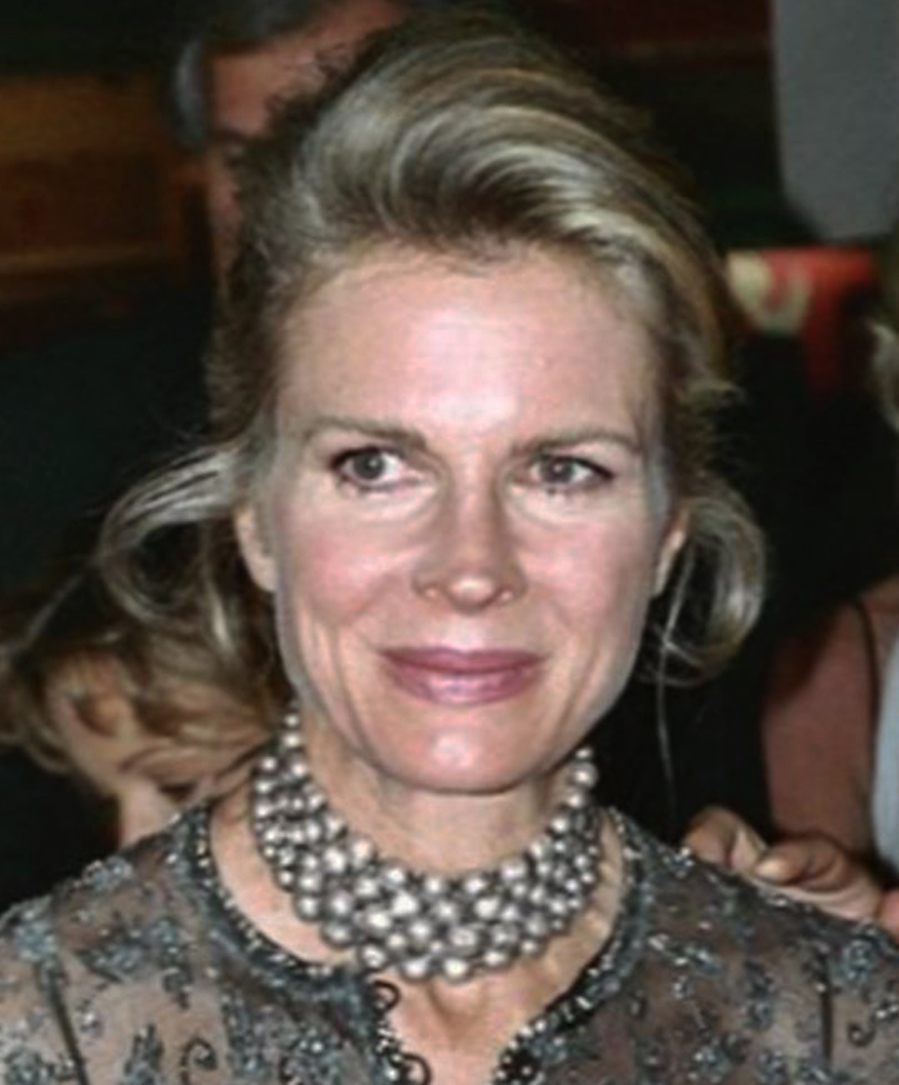
Candice Bergen won twice for Murphy Brown.

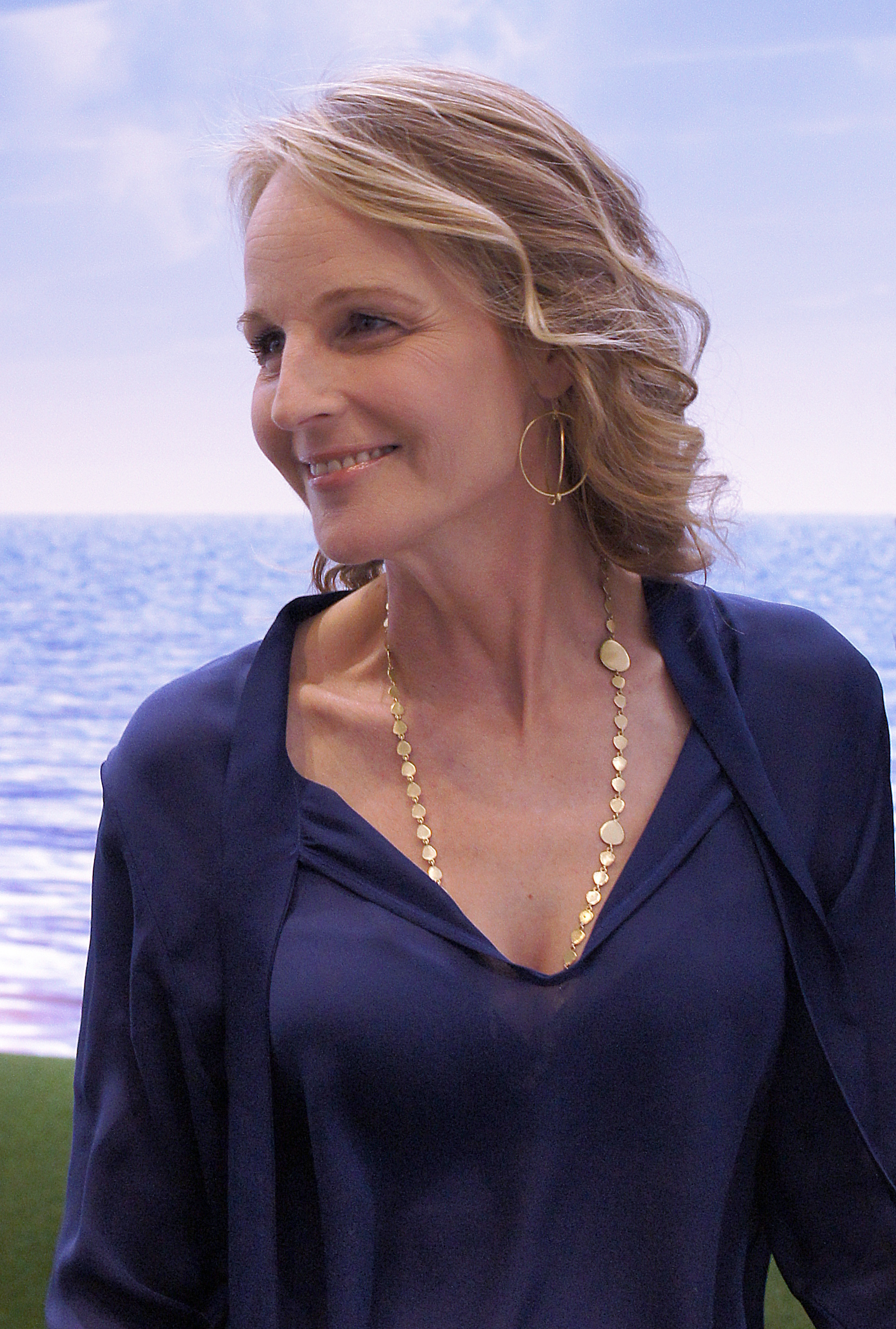
Helen Hunt won thrice for Mad About You in 1993-94, 96.

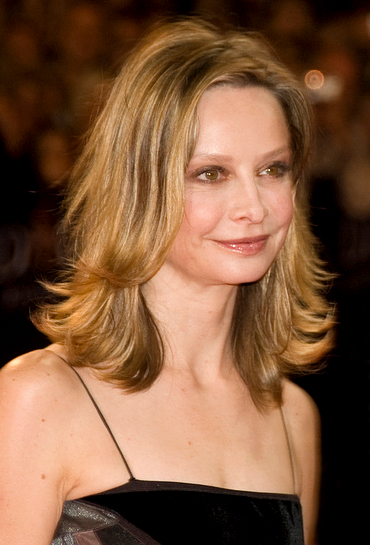
Calista Flockhart won in 1997 for Ally McBeal.

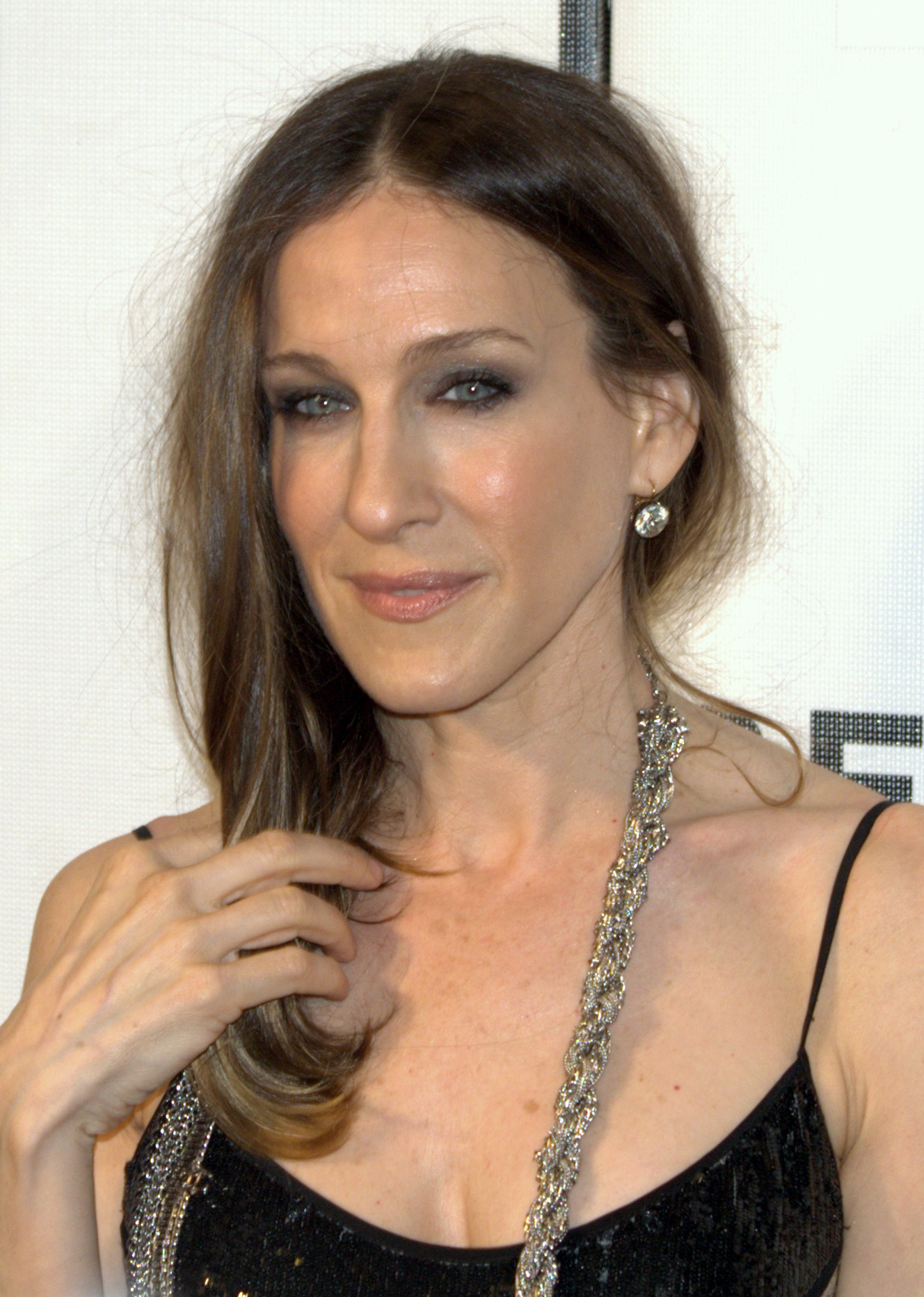
Sarah Jessica Parker won four times playing Carrie Bradshaw in Sex and the City.

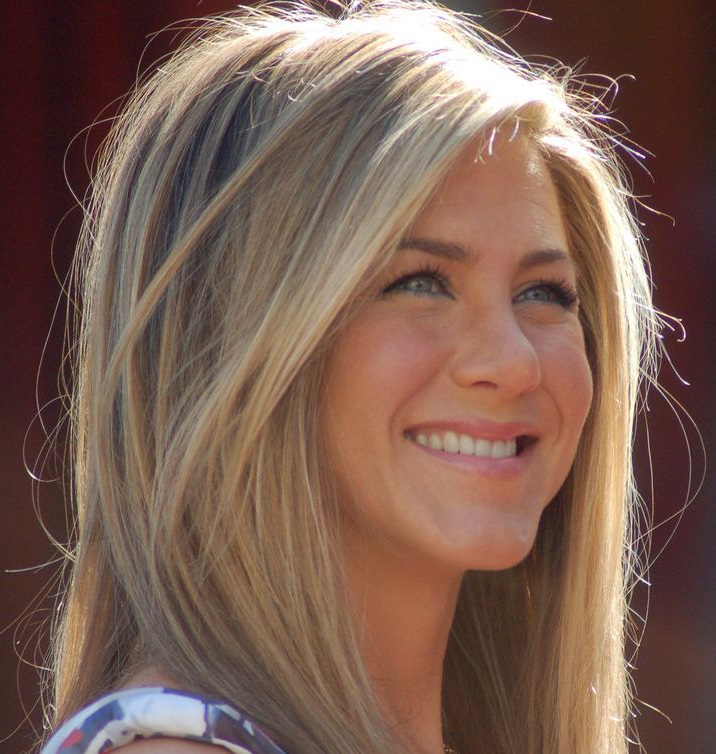
Jennifer Aniston won playing Rachel Green in Friends in 2002.

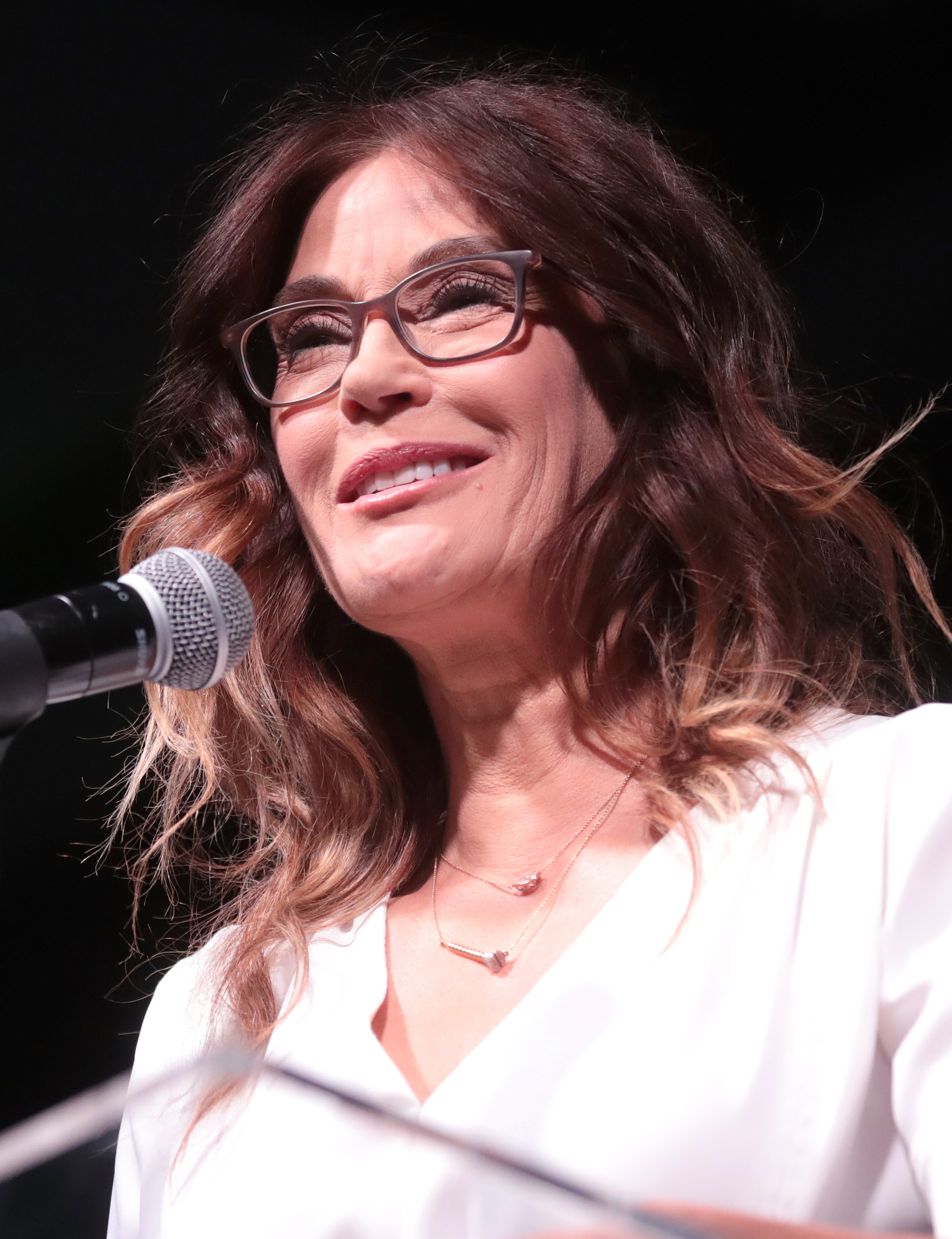
Teri Hatcher won for playing Susan Mayer in Desperate Housewives in 2004.

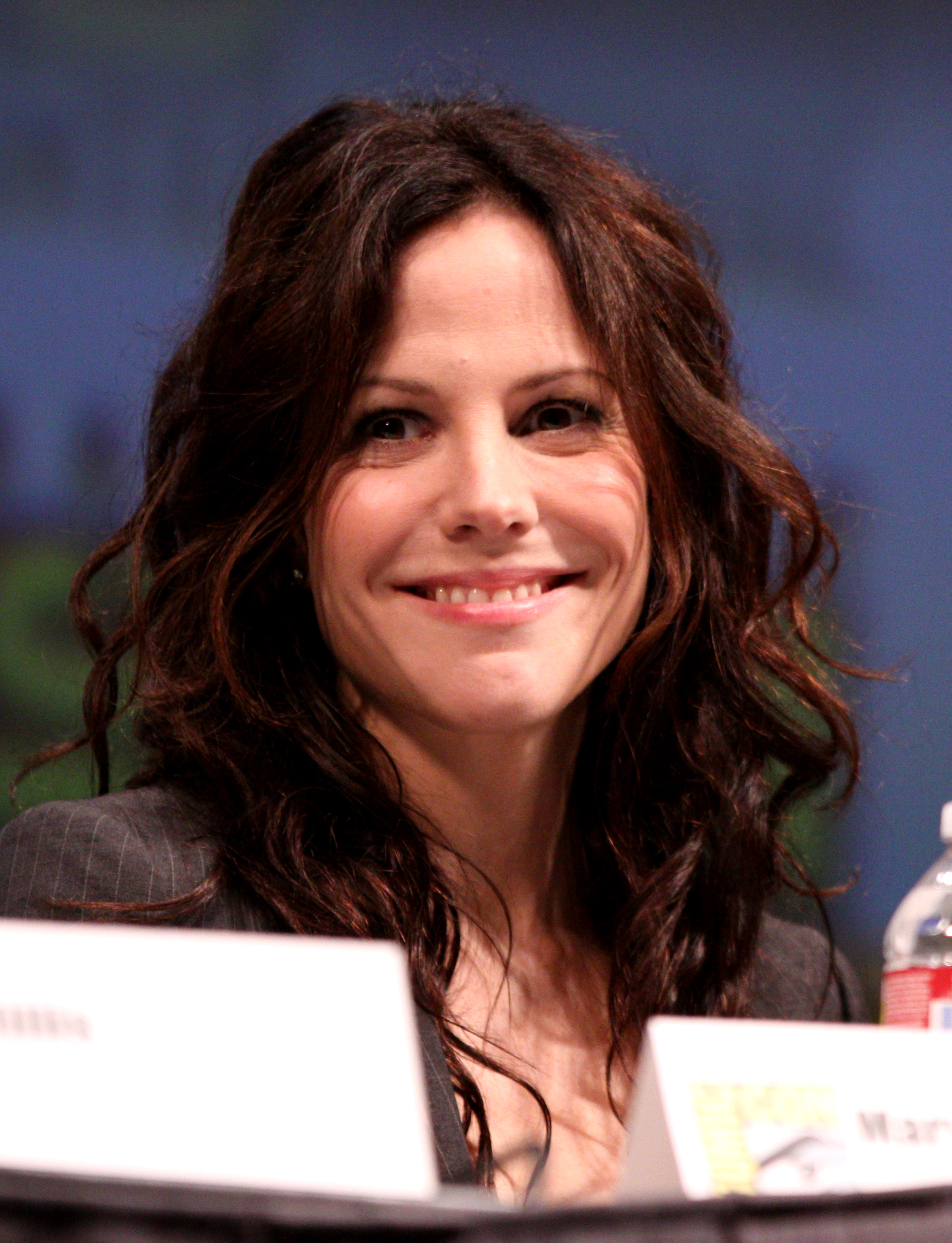
Mary-Louise Parker won for Weeds in 2005.

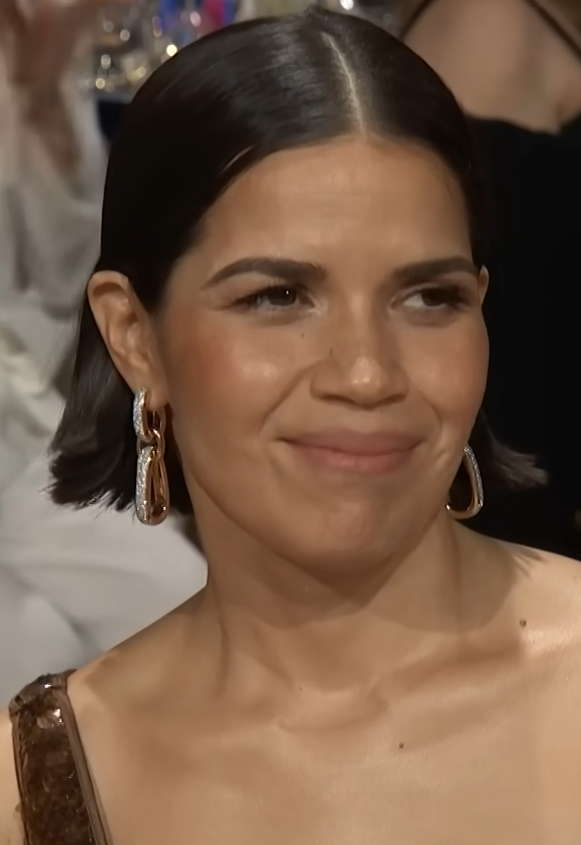
America Ferrera won for playing Betty Suarez in Ugly Betty.

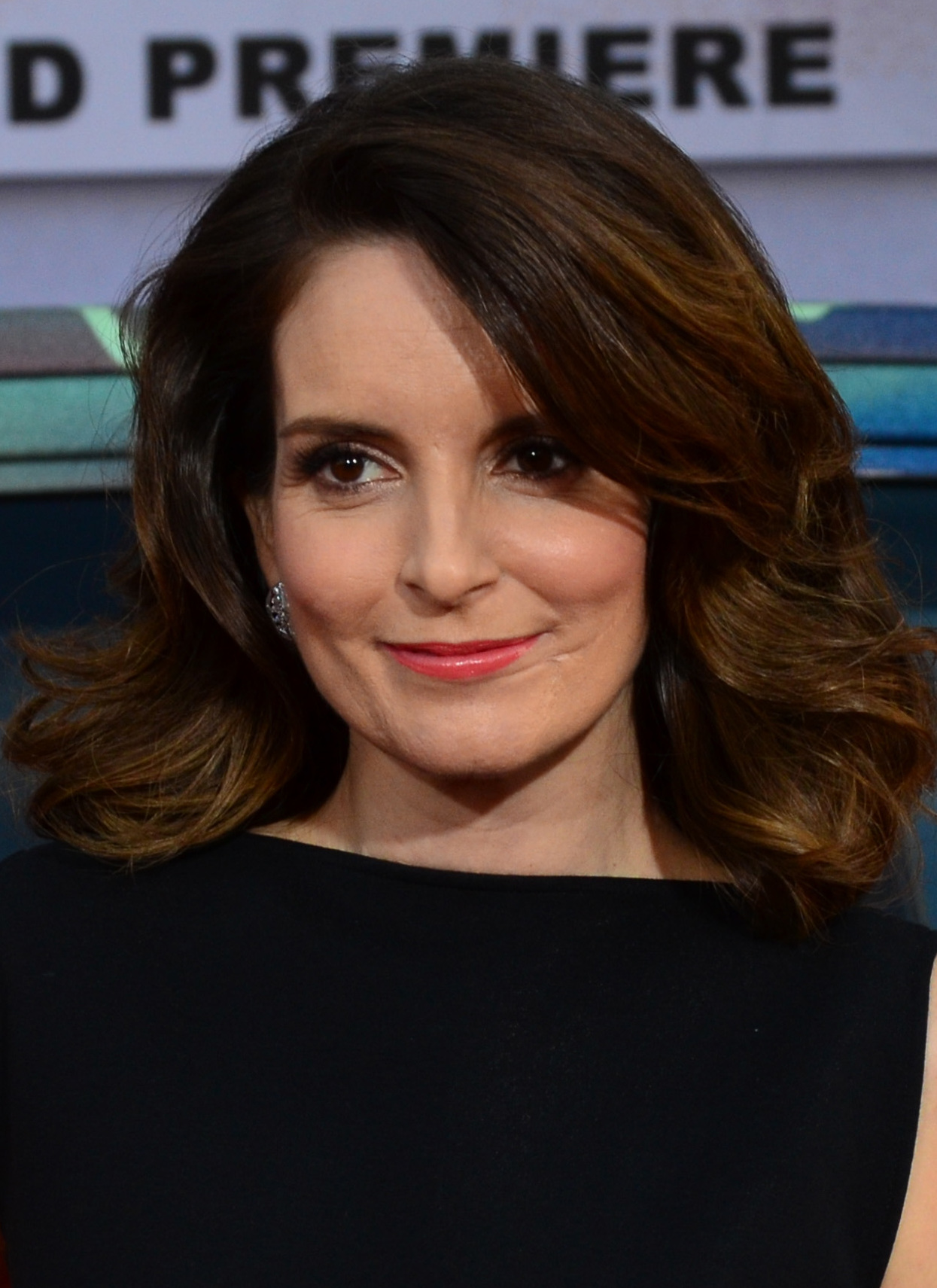
Tina Fey won for playing Liz Lemon in 30 Rock in 2007-08.

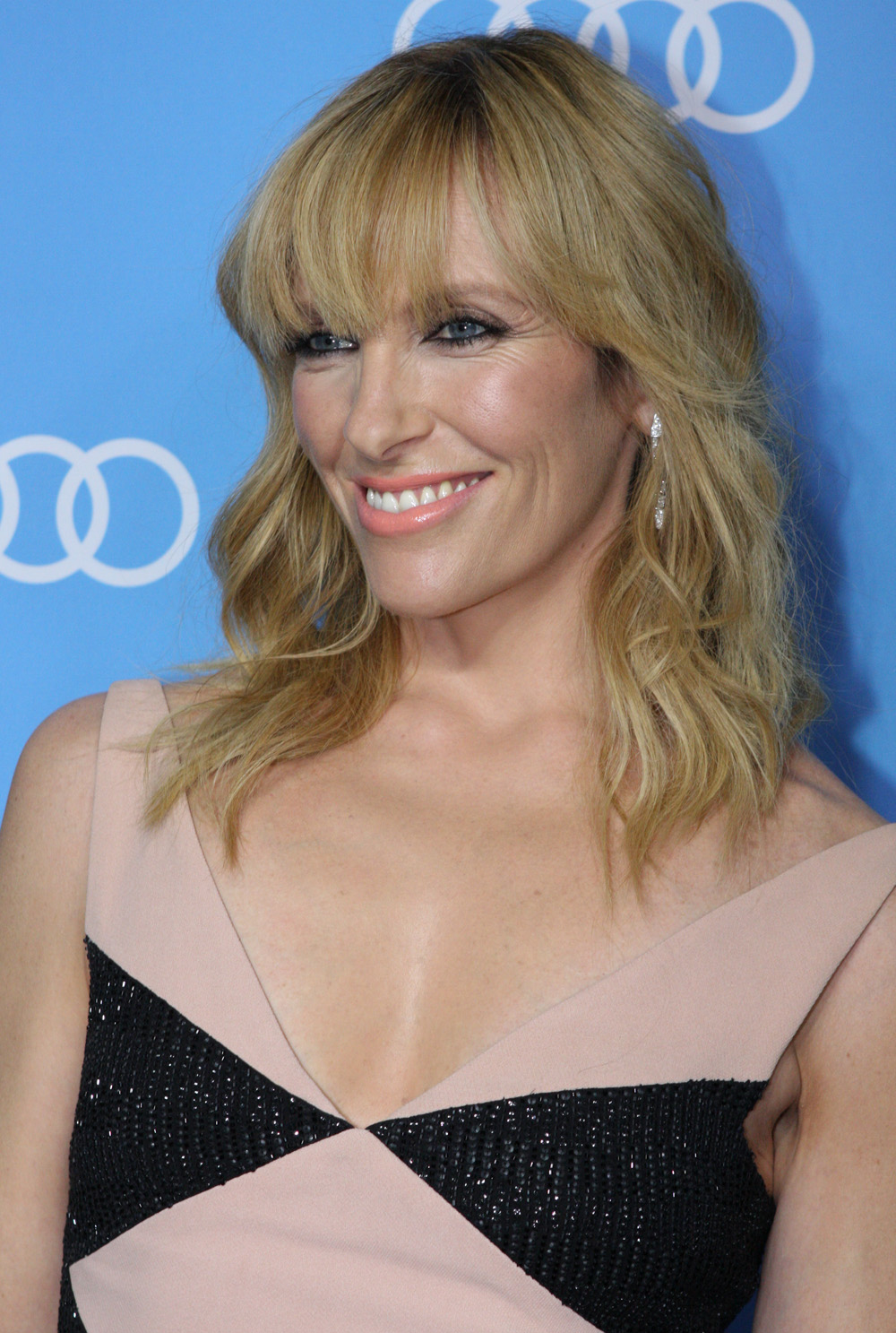
Toni Collette won for United States of Tara in 2009.

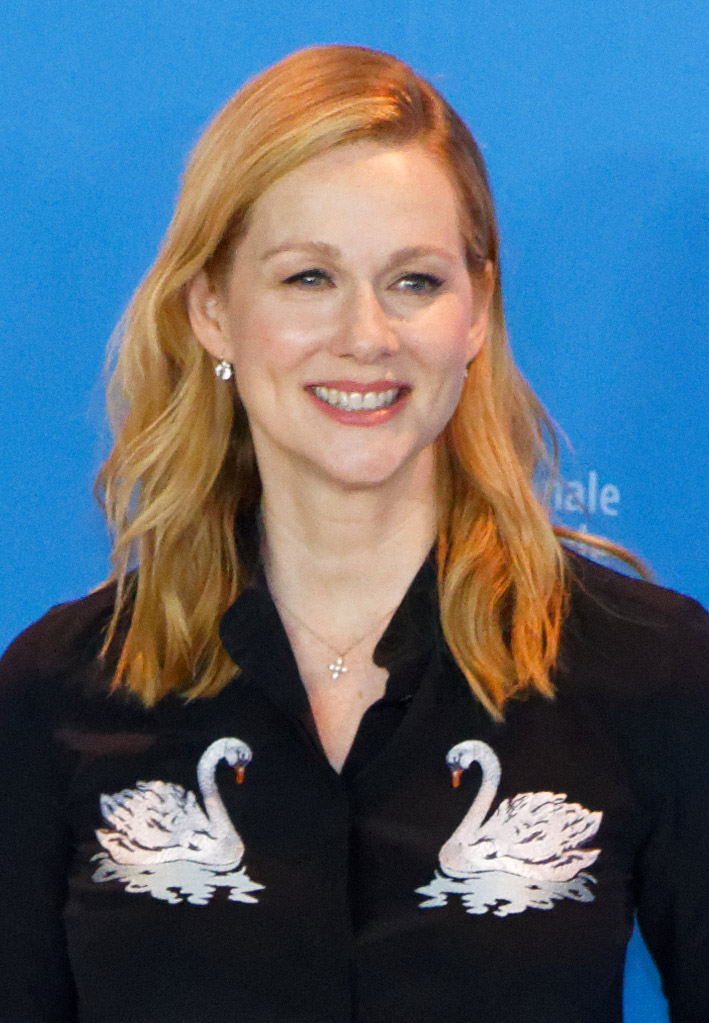
Laura Linney won for The Big C in 2010.

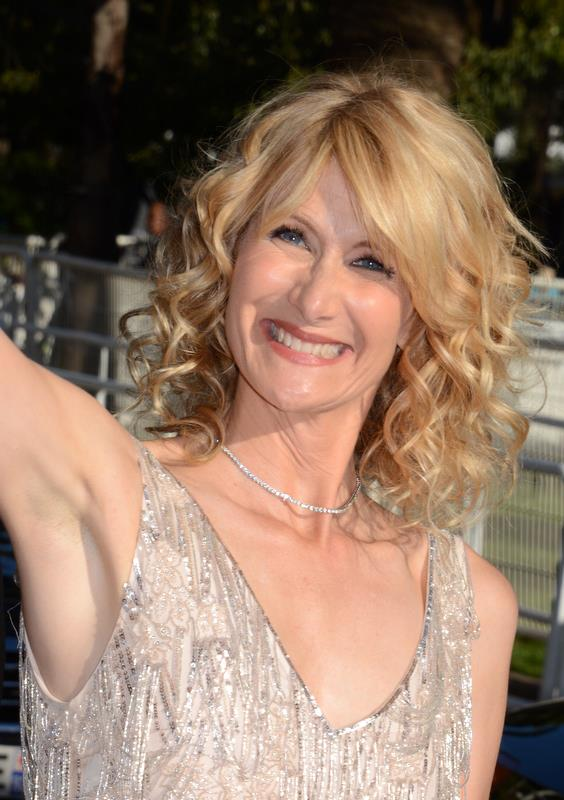
Laura Dern won for Enlightened in 2011.

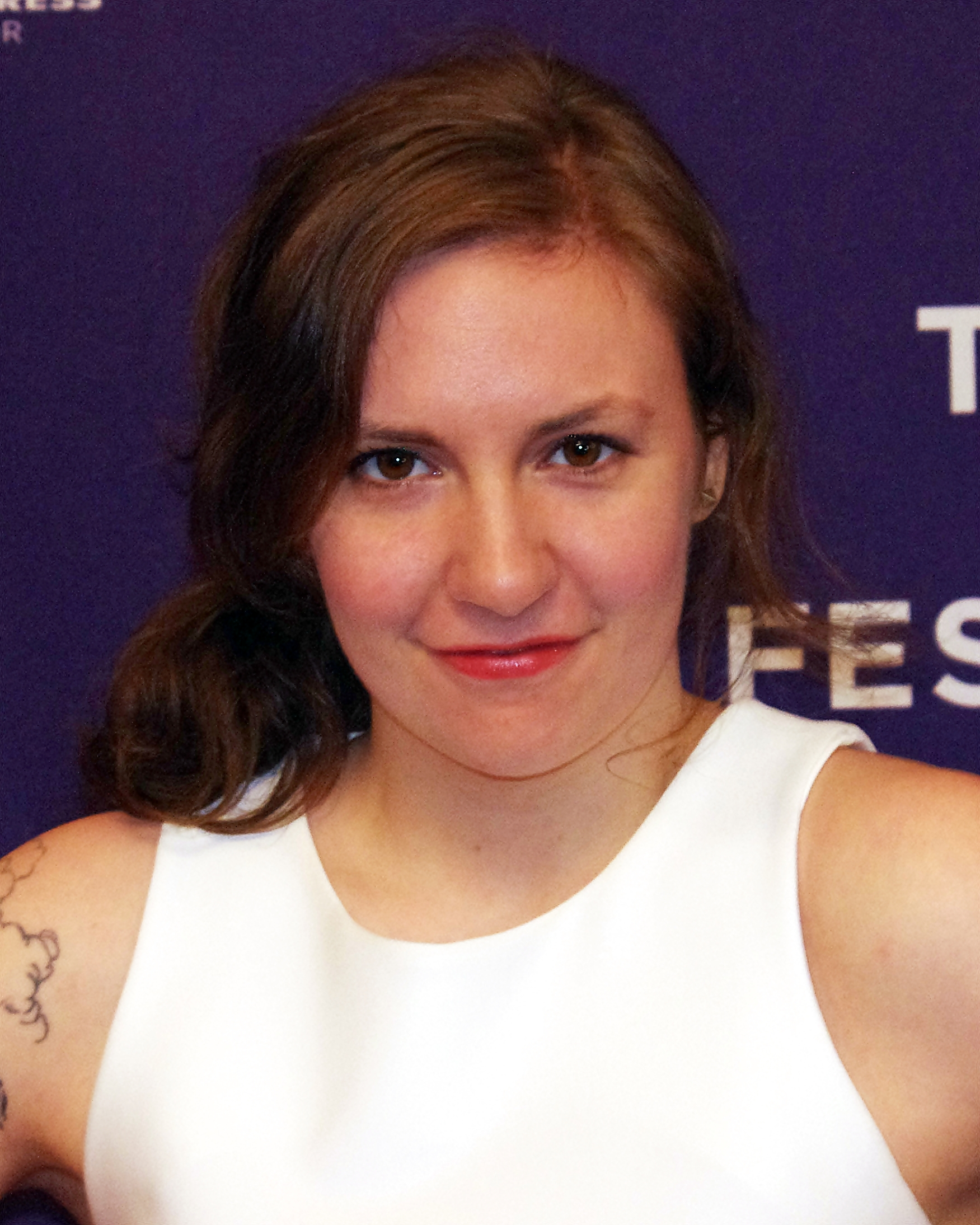
Lena Dunham won for Girls in 2012.

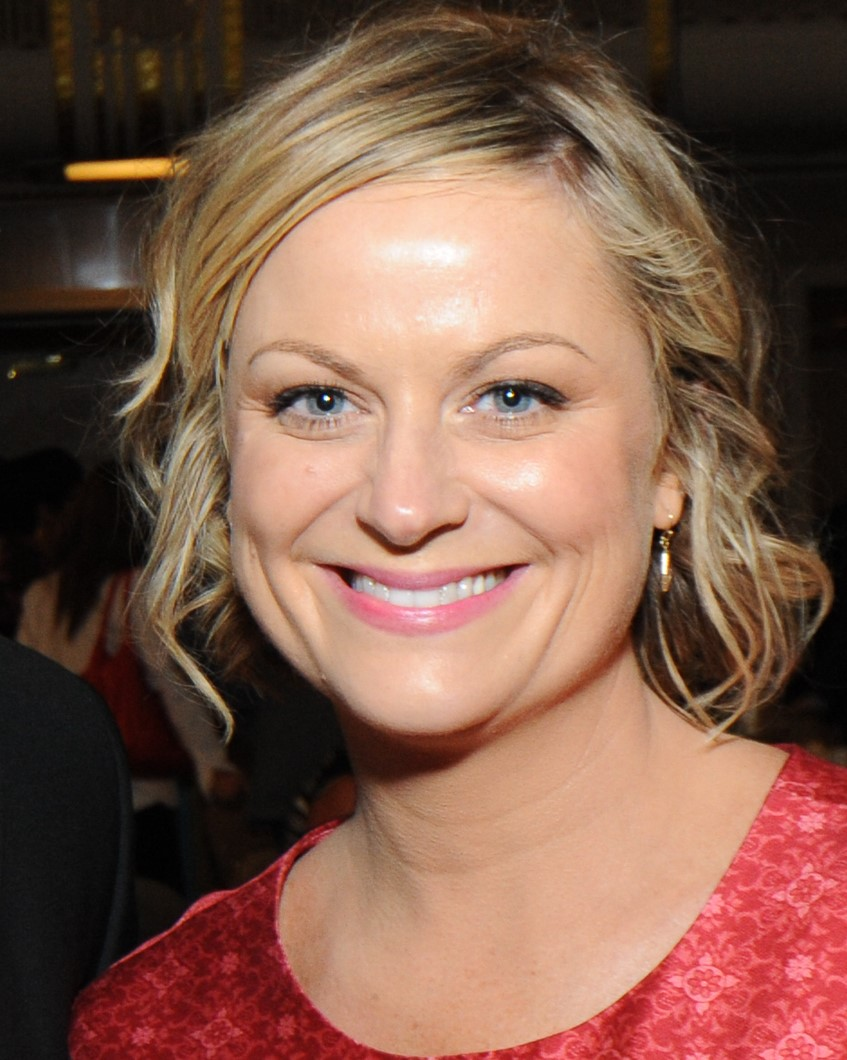
Amy Poehler won for Parks and Recreation in 2013.

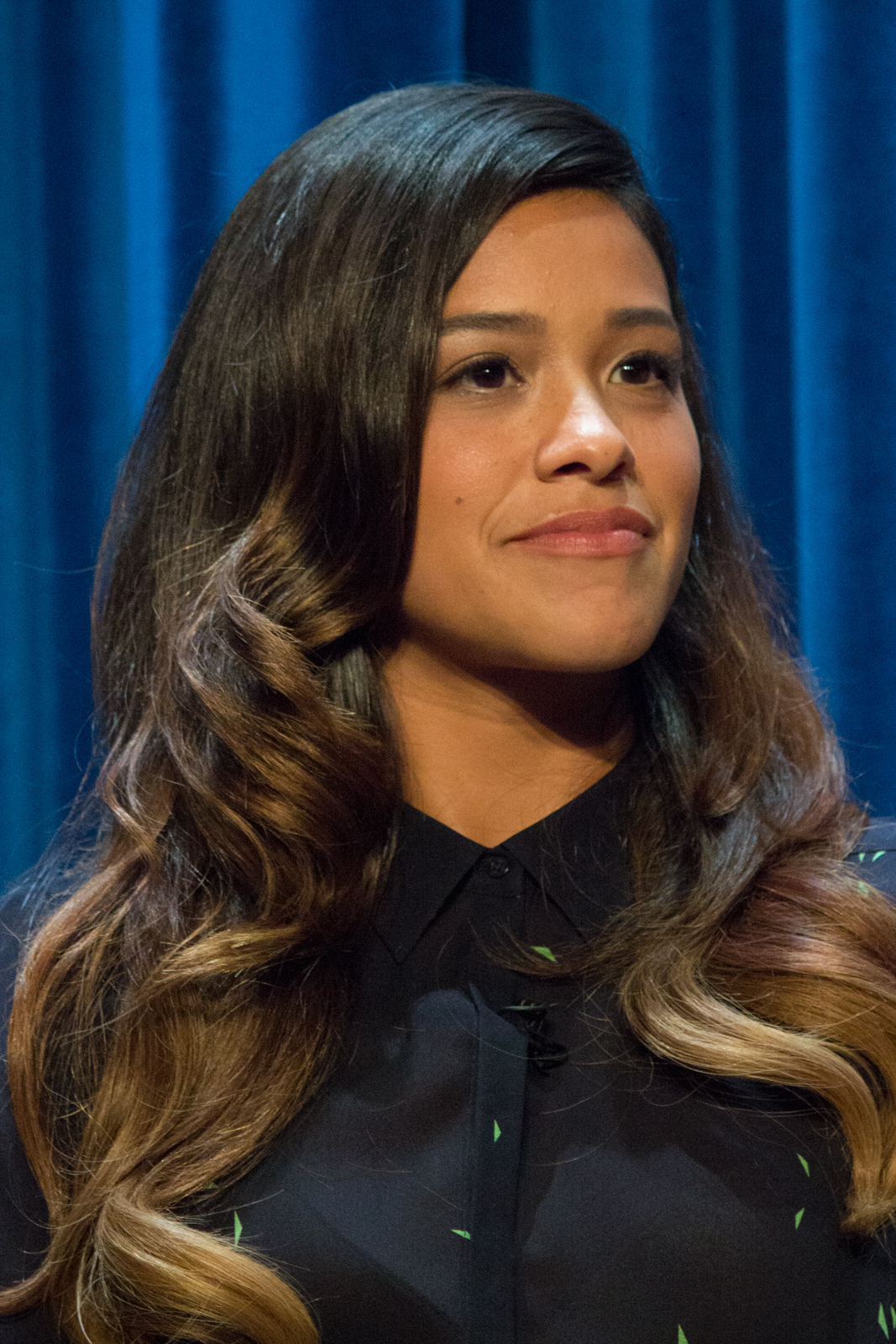
Gina Rodriguez won for Jane the Virgin in 2014.

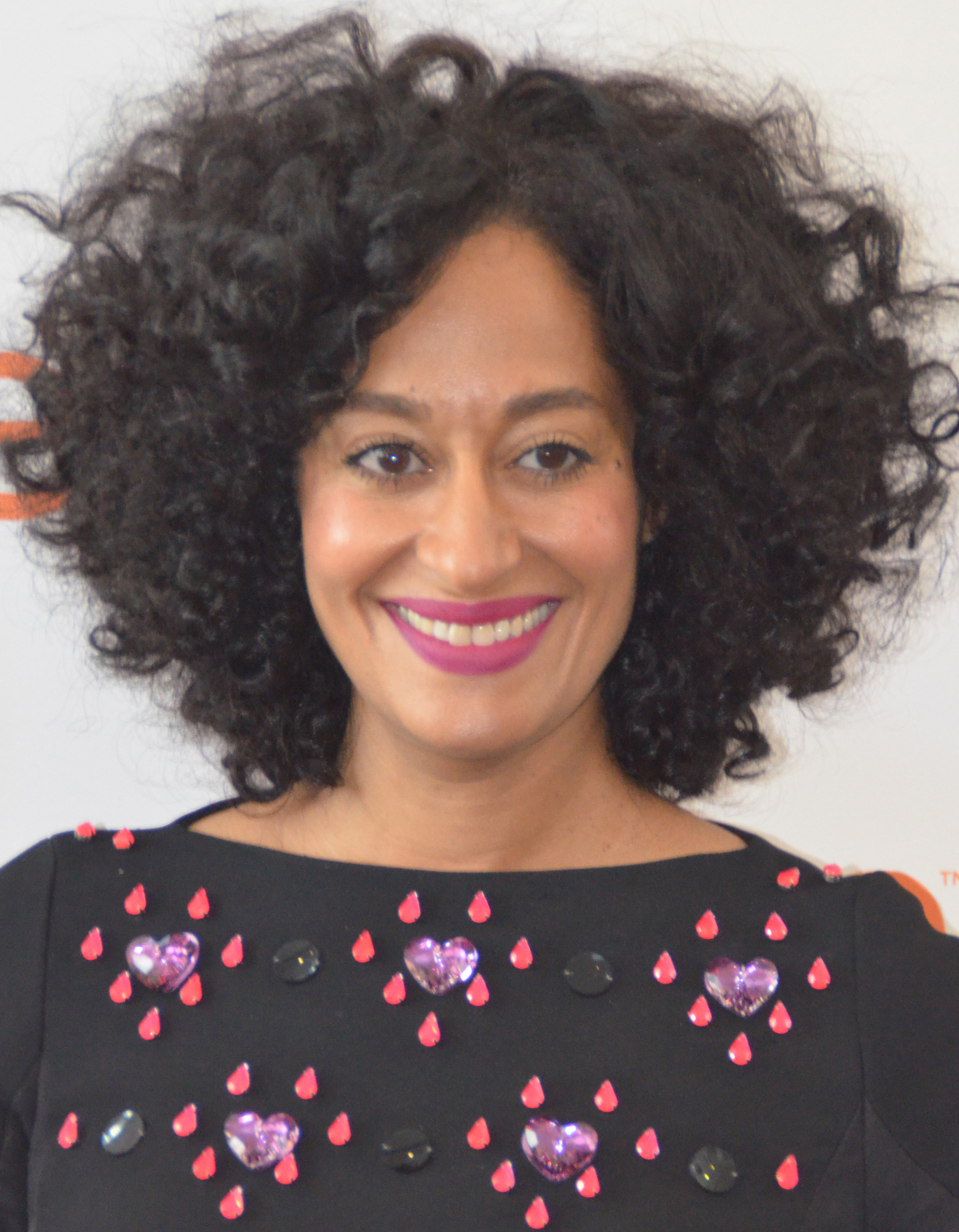
Tracee Ellis Ross won for Black-ish in 2016.

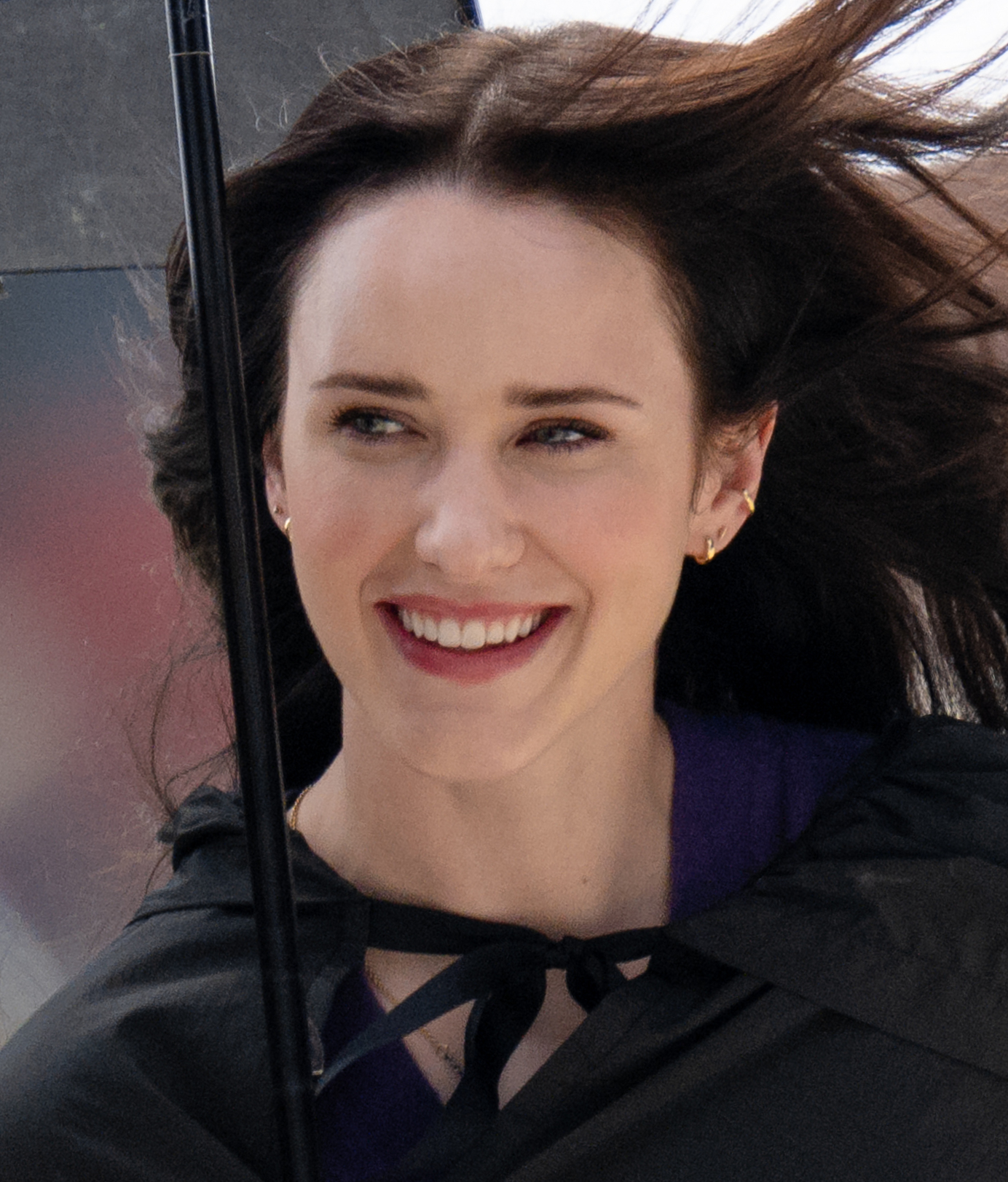
Rachel Brosnahan won twice for The Marvelous Mrs. Maisel in 2017-18.

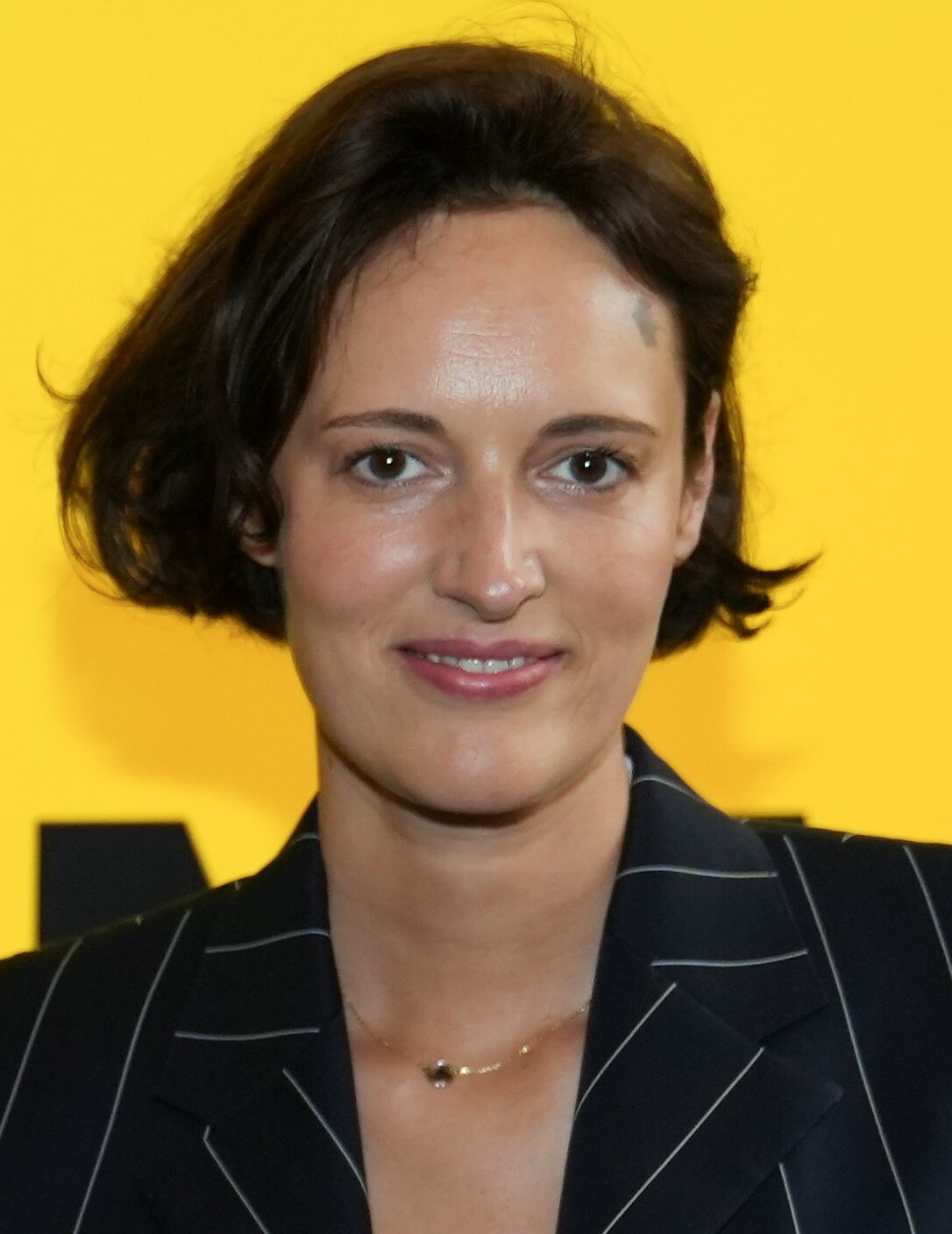
Phoebe Waller-Bridge won for Fleabag in 2019.

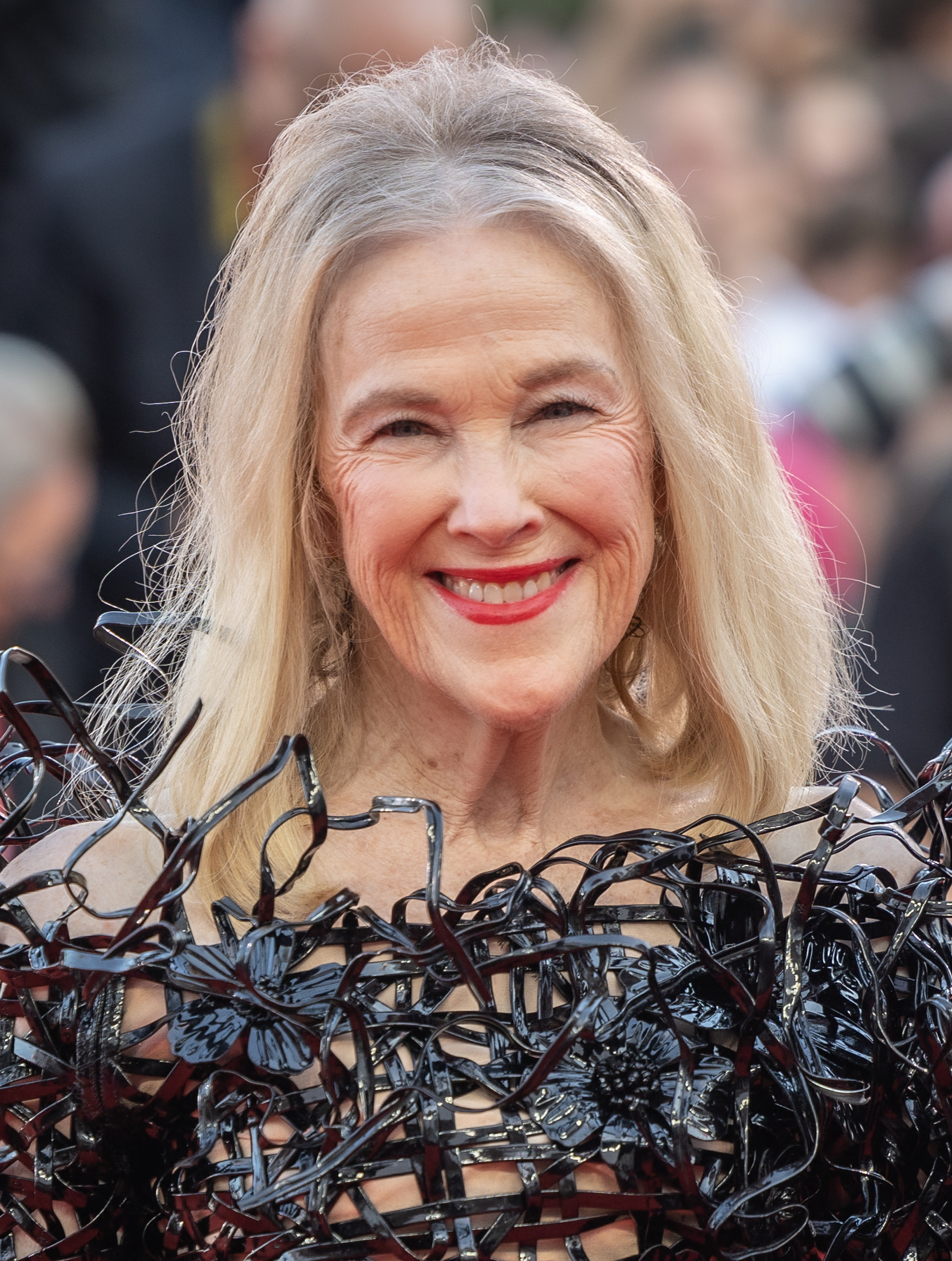
Catherine O'Hara won for Schitt's Creek in 2020.

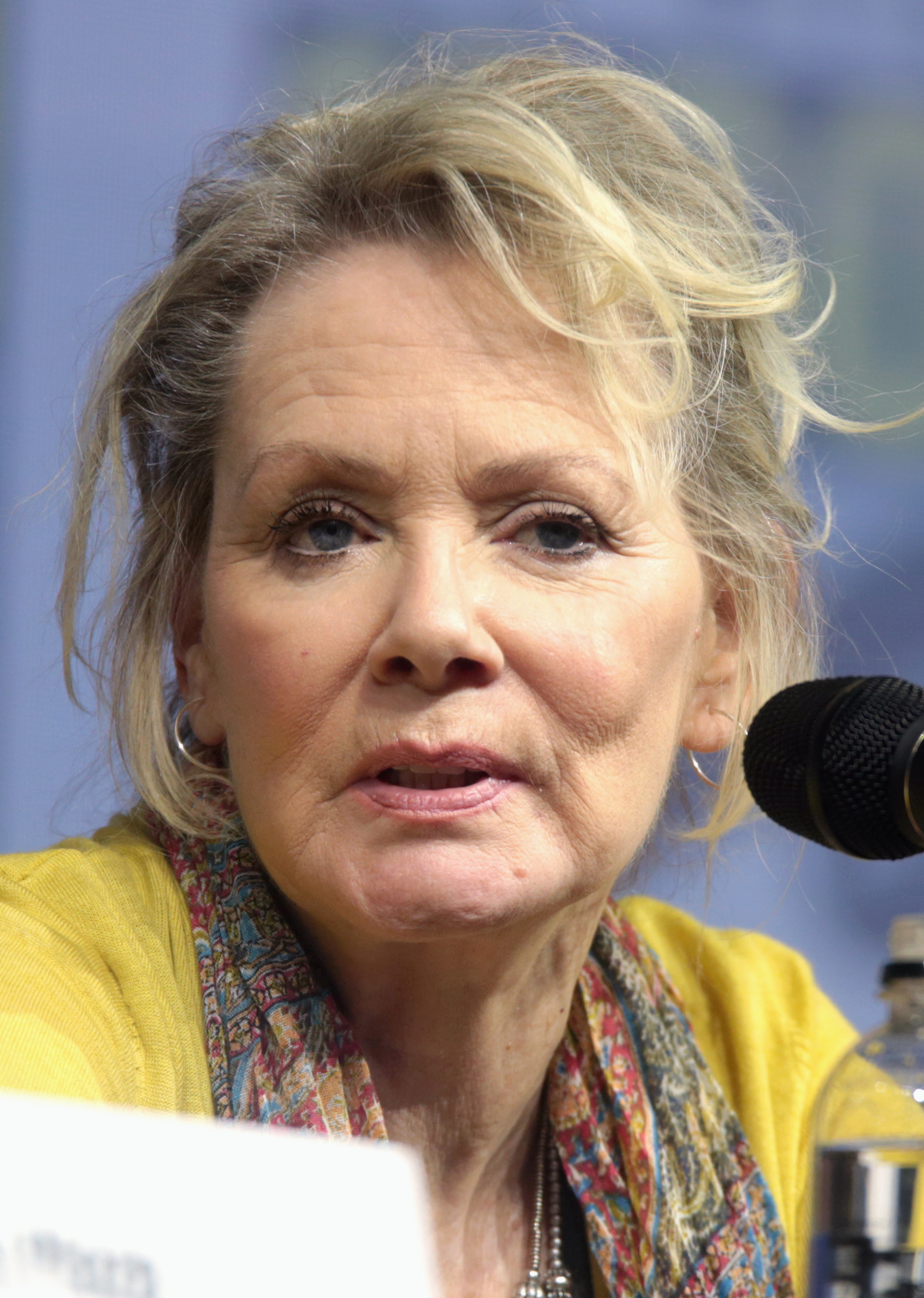
Jean Smart won thrice for Hacks in 2021, 2024, and 2025.

Quinta Brunson won for Abbott Elementary in 2022.

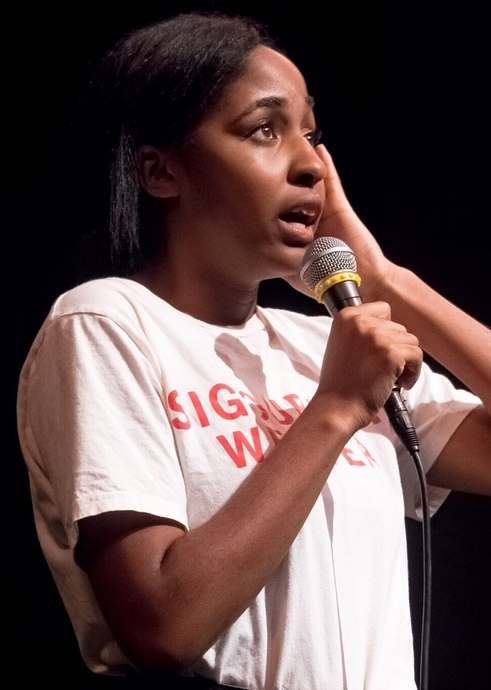
Ayo Edebiri won for The Bear in 2023.

=== 1960s ===
Year	Actor	Role	Program	Network	Ref
Best TV Star – Female
1961 (19th)
1961 (19th)	Pauline Fredericks ‡				
1962 (20th)
1962 (20th)	Donna Reed ‡	Donna Stone	The Donna Reed Show	ABC	
1963 (21st)
1963 (21st)	Inger Stevens ‡	Katrin "Katy" Holstrum	The Farmer's Daughter	ABC	
1963 (21st)	Shirley Booth	Hazel Burke	Hazel	NBC	
1963 (21st)	Dorothy Loudon	Various Characters	The Garry Moore Show	CBS	
1963 (21st)	Carolyn Jones	Betsy / Meredith / Jane / Olivia	Burke's Law	ABC	
1963 (21st)	Gloria Swanson	Venus Walsh	Burke's Law	ABC	
1964 (22nd)
1964 (22nd)	Mary Tyler Moore ‡	Laura Petrie	The Dick Van Dyke Show	CBS	
1964 (22nd)	Dorothy Malone	Constance Carson	Peyton Place	ABC	
1964 (22nd)	Yvette Mimieux	Pat Holmes	Dr. Kildare	NBC	
1964 (22nd)	Elizabeth Montgomery	Samantha Stephens	Bewitched	ABC	
1964 (22nd)	Julie Newmar	Rhoda Miller	My Living Doll	CBS	
1965 (23rd)
1965 (23rd)	Anne Francis ‡	Honey West	Honey West	ABC	
1965 (23rd)	Patty Duke	Patty Lane / Cathy Lane	The Patty Duke Show	ABC	
1965 (23rd)	Mia Farrow	Allison MacKenzie	Peyton Place	ABC	
1965 (23rd)	Dorothy Malone	Constance Carson	Peyton Place	ABC	
1965 (23rd)	Barbara Stanwyck	Victoria Barkley	The Big Valley	ABC	
1966 (24th)
1966 (24th)	Marlo Thomas ‡	Ann Marie	That Girl	ABC	
1966 (24th)	Phyllis Diller	Phyllis Pruitt	The Pruitts of Southampton	ABC	
1966 (24th)	Barbara Eden	Jeannie	I Dream of Jeannie	NBC	
1966 (24th)	Elizabeth Montgomery	Samantha Stephens	Bewitched	ABC	
1966 (24th)	Barbara Stanwyck	Victoria Barkley	The Big Valley	ABC	
1967 (25th)
1967 (25th)	Carol Burnett ‡	Various Characters	The Carol Burnett Show	CBS	
1967 (25th)	Barbara Bain	Cinnamon Carter	Mission: Impossible	CBS	
1967 (25th)	Lucille Ball	Lucy Carmichael	The Lucy Show	CBS	
1967 (25th)	Nancy Sinatra	Various characters	Movin' with Nancy	NBC	
1967 (25th)	Barbara Stanwyck	Victoria Barkley	The Big Valley	ABC	
1968 (26th)
1968 (26th)	Diahann Carroll ‡	Julia Baker	Julia	NBC	
1968 (26th)	Doris Day	Doris Martin	The Doris Day Show	CBS	
1968 (26th)	Hope Lange	Carolyn Muir	The Ghost & Mrs. Muir	NBC	
1968 (26th)	Elizabeth Montgomery	Samantha Stephens	Bewitched	ABC	
1968 (26th)	Nancy Sinatra	Various characters	The Nancy Sinatra Show	NBC	
Best TV Actress – Musical or Comedy
1969 (27th)
1969 (27th)	Carol Burnett ‡	Various characters	The Carol Burnett Show	CBS	
1969 (27th)	Julie Sommars ‡	Jennifer Jo Drinkwater	The Governor & J.J.	CBS	
1969 (27th)	Lucille Ball	Lucy Carter	Here's Lucy	CBS	
1969 (27th)	Diahann Carroll	Julia Baker	Julia	NBC	
1969 (27th)	Barbara Eden	Jeannie	I Dream of Jeannie	NBC	
1969 (27th)	Debbie Reynolds	Debbie Thompson	The Debbie Reynolds Show	NBC	

=== 1970s ===
Year	Actor	Role	Program	Network	Ref
1970 (28th)
1970 (28th)	Mary Tyler Moore ‡	Mary Richards	The Mary Tyler Moore Show	CBS	
1970 (28th)	Carol Burnett	Various characters	The Carol Burnett Show	CBS	
1970 (28th)	Shirley Jones	Shirley Partridge	The Partridge Family	ABC	
1970 (28th)	Juliet Mills	Nanny Phoebe Figgalily	Nanny and the Professor	ABC	
1970 (28th)	Elizabeth Montgomery	Samantha Stephens	Bewitched	ABC	
1971 (29th)
1971 (29th)	Carol Burnett ‡	Various characters	The Carol Burnett Show	CBS	
1971 (29th)	Lucille Ball	Lucy Carter	Here's Lucy	CBS	
1971 (29th)	Shirley Jones	Shirley Partridge	The Partridge Family	ABC	
1971 (29th)	Mary Tyler Moore	Mary Richards	The Mary Tyler Moore Show	CBS	
1971 (29th)	Jean Stapleton	Edith Bunker	All in the Family	CBS	
1972 (30th)
1972 (30th)	Jean Stapleton ‡	Edith Bunker	All in the Family	CBS	
1972 (30th)	Julie Andrews	Various characters	The Julie Andrews Hour	ABC	
1972 (30th)	Bea Arthur	Maude Findlay	Maude	CBS	
1972 (30th)	Carol Burnett	Various characters	The Carol Burnett Show	CBS	
1972 (30th)	Mary Tyler Moore	Mary Richards	The Mary Tyler Moore Show	CBS	
1973 (31st)
1973 (31st)	Cher ‡	Various characters	The Sonny & Cher Comedy Hour	CBS	
1973 (31st)	Jean Stapleton ‡	Edith Bunker	All in the Family	CBS	
1973 (31st)	Bea Arthur	Maude Findlay	Maude	CBS	
1973 (31st)	Carol Burnett	Various characters	The Carol Burnett Show	CBS	
1973 (31st)	Mary Tyler Moore	Mary Richards	The Mary Tyler Moore Show	CBS	
1974 (32nd)
1974 (32nd)	Valerie Harper ‡	Rhoda Morgenstern	Rhoda	CBS	
1974 (32nd)	Carol Burnett	Various characters	The Carol Burnett Show	CBS	
1974 (32nd)	Mary Tyler Moore	Mary Richards	The Mary Tyler Moore Show	CBS	
1974 (32nd)	Esther Rolle	Florida Evans	Good Times	CBS	
1974 (32nd)	Jean Stapleton	Edith Bunker	All in the Family	CBS	
1975 (33rd)
1975 (33rd)	Cloris Leachman ‡	Phyllis Lindstrom	Phyllis	CBS	
1975 (33rd)	Bea Arthur	Maude Findlay	Maude	CBS	
1975 (33rd)	Carol Burnett	Various characters	The Carol Burnett Show	CBS	
1975 (33rd)	Valerie Harper	Rhoda Morgenstern	Rhoda	CBS	
1975 (33rd)	Mary Tyler Moore	Mary Richards	The Mary Tyler Moore Show	CBS	
1976 (34th)
1976 (34th)	Carol Burnett ‡	Various characters	The Carol Burnett Show	CBS	
1976 (34th)	Bernadette Peters	Charlotte "Charley" Drake	All's Fair	CBS	
1976 (34th)	Mary Tyler Moore	Mary Richards	The Mary Tyler Moore Show	CBS	
1976 (34th)	Isabel Sanford	Louise Jefferson	The Jeffersons	CBS	
1976 (34th)	Dinah Shore	Dinah	Dinah!	NBC	
1977 (35th)
1977 (35th)	Carol Burnett ‡	Various characters	The Carol Burnett Show	CBS	
1977 (35th)	Bea Arthur	Maude Findlay	Maude	CBS	
1977 (35th)	Penny Marshall	Laverne DeFazio	Laverne & Shirley	ABC	
1977 (35th)	Isabel Sanford	Louise Jefferson	The Jeffersons	CBS	
1977 (35th)	Jean Stapleton	Edith Bunker	All in the Family	CBS	
1977 (35th)	Cindy Williams	Shirley Feeney	Laverne & Shirley	ABC	
1978 (36th)
1978 (36th)	Linda Lavin ‡	Alice Hyatt	Alice	CBS	
1978 (36th)	Carol Burnett	Various characters	The Carol Burnett Show	CBS	
1978 (36th)	Penny Marshall	Laverne DeFazio	Laverne & Shirley	ABC	
1978 (36th)	Suzanne Somers	Chrissy Snow	Three's Company	ABC	
1978 (36th)	Jean Stapleton	Edith Bunker	All in the Family	CBS	
1979 (37th)
1979 (37th)	Linda Lavin ‡	Alice Hyatt	Alice	CBS	
1979 (37th)	Penny Marshall	Laverne DeFazio	Laverne & Shirley	ABC	
1979 (37th)	Donna Pescow	Angie Falco	Angie	ABC	
1979 (37th)	Jean Stapleton	Edith Bunker	All in the Family	CBS	
1979 (37th)	Loretta Swit	Maj. Margaret Houlihan	M*A*S*H	CBS	

=== 1980s ===
Year	Actor	Role	Program	Network	Ref
1980 (38th)
1980 (38th)	Katherine Helmond ‡	Jessica Tate	Soap	ABC	
1980 (38th)	Loni Anderson	Jennifer Marlowe	WKRP in Cincinnati	CBS	
1980 (38th)	Polly Holliday	Florence Jean Castleberry	Flo	CBS	
1980 (38th)	Linda Lavin	Alice Hyatt	Alice	CBS	
1980 (38th)	Lynn Redgrave	Ann Atkinson	House Calls	CBS	
1981 (39th)
1981 (39th)	Eileen Brennan ‡	Capt. Doreen Lewis	Private Benjamin	CBS	
1981 (39th)	Loni Anderson	Jennifer Marlowe	WKRP in Cincinnati	CBS	
1981 (39th)	Bonnie Franklin	Ann Romano	One Day at a Time	CBS	
1981 (39th)	Barbara Mandrell	Herself	Barbara Mandrell & the Mandrell Sisters	NBC	
1981 (39th)	Loretta Swit	Maj. Margaret Houlihan	M*A*S*H	CBS	
1982 (40th)
1982 (40th)	Debbie Allen ‡	Lydia Grant	Fame	NBC	
1982 (40th)	Eileen Brennan	Capt. Doreen Lewis	Private Benjamin	CBS	
1982 (40th)	Nell Carter	Nell Harper	Gimme a Break!	NBC	
1982 (40th)	Bonnie Franklin	Ann Romano	One Day at a Time	CBS	
1982 (40th)	Rita Moreno	Violet Newstead	9 to 5	ABC	
1982 (40th)	Isabel Sanford	Louise Jefferson	The Jeffersons	CBS	
1983 (41st)
1983 (41st)	Joanna Cassidy ‡	Jojo White	Buffalo Bill	NBC	
1983 (41st)	Debbie Allen	Lydia Grant	Fame	NBC	
1983 (41st)	Madeline Kahn	Madeline Wayne	Oh Madeline	ABC	
1983 (41st)	Shelley Long	Diane Chambers	Cheers	NBC	
1983 (41st)	Isabel Sanford	Louise Jefferson	The Jeffersons	CBS	
1984 (42nd)
1984 (42nd)	Shelley Long ‡	Diane Chambers	Cheers	NBC	
1984 (42nd)	Debbie Allen	Lydia Grant	Fame	NBC	
1984 (42nd)	Nell Carter	Nell Harper	Gimme a Break!	NBC	
1984 (42nd)	Susan Clark	Katherine Papadopalis	Webster	ABC	
1984 (42nd)	Jane Curtin	Allie Lowell	Kate & Allie	CBS	
1984 (42nd)	Isabel Sanford	Louise Jefferson	The Jeffersons	CBS	
1985 (43rd)
1985 (43rd)	Estelle Getty ‡	Sophia Petrillo	The Golden Girls	NBC	
1985 (43rd)	Cybill Shepherd ‡	Maddie Hayes	Moonlighting	ABC	
1985 (43rd)	Bea Arthur	Dorothy Zbornak	The Golden Girls	NBC	
1985 (43rd)	Rue McClanahan	Blanche Devereaux	The Golden Girls	NBC	
1985 (43rd)	Betty White	Rose Nylund	The Golden Girls	NBC	
1986 (44th)
1986 (44th)	Cybill Shepherd ‡	Maddie Hayes	Moonlighting	ABC	
1986 (44th)	Bea Arthur	Dorothy Zbornak	The Golden Girls	NBC	
1986 (44th)	Estelle Getty	Sophia Petrillo	The Golden Girls	NBC	
1986 (44th)	Rue McClanahan	Blanche Devereaux	The Golden Girls	NBC	
1986 (44th)	Betty White	Rose Nylund	The Golden Girls	NBC	
1987 (45th)
1987 (45th)	Tracey Ullman ‡	Various characters	The Tracey Ullman Show	Fox	
1987 (45th)	Bea Arthur	Dorothy Zbornak	The Golden Girls	NBC	
1987 (45th)	Rue McClanahan	Blanche Devereaux	The Golden Girls	NBC	
1987 (45th)	Cybill Shepherd	Maddie Hayes	Moonlighting	ABC	
1987 (45th)	Betty White	Rose Nylund	The Golden Girls	NBC	
1988 (46th)
1988 (46th)	Candice Bergen ‡	Murphy Brown	Murphy Brown	CBS	
1988 (46th)	Bea Arthur	Dorothy Zbornak	The Golden Girls	NBC	
1988 (46th)	Roseanne Barr	Roseanne Conner	Roseanne	ABC	
1988 (46th)	Tracey Ullman	Various characters	The Tracey Ullman Show	Fox	
1988 (46th)	Betty White	Rose Nylund	The Golden Girls	NBC	
1989 (47th)
1989 (47th)	Jamie Lee Curtis ‡	Hannah Miller	Anything but Love	ABC	
1989 (47th)	Kirstie Alley	Rebecca Howe	Cheers	NBC	
1989 (47th)	Stephanie Beacham	Sister Kate Lambert	Sister Kate	NBC	
1989 (47th)	Candice Bergen	Murphy Brown	Murphy Brown	CBS	
1989 (47th)	Tracey Ullman	Various characters	The Tracey Ullman Show	Fox	

=== 1990s ===
Year	Actor	Role	Program	Network	Ref
1990 (48th)
1990 (48th)	Kirstie Alley ‡	Rebecca Howe	Cheers	NBC	
1990 (48th)	Roseanne Barr	Roseanne Conner	Roseanne	ABC	
1990 (48th)	Candice Bergen	Murphy Brown	Murphy Brown	CBS	
1990 (48th)	Carol Burnett	Various characters	Carol & Company	NBC	
1990 (48th)	Katey Sagal	Peggy Bundy	Married... with Children	Fox	
1991 (49th)
1991 (49th)	Candice Bergen ‡	Murphy Brown	Murphy Brown	CBS	
1991 (49th)	Kirstie Alley	Rebecca Howe	Cheers	NBC	
1991 (49th)	Roseanne Barr	Roseanne Conner	Roseanne	ABC	
1991 (49th)	Jamie Lee Curtis	Hannah Miller	Anything but Love	ABC	
1991 (49th)	Katey Sagal	Peggy Bundy	Married... with Children	Fox	
1992 (50th)
1992 (50th)	Roseanne Barr ‡	Roseanne Conner	Roseanne	ABC	
1992 (50th)	Kirstie Alley	Rebecca Howe	Cheers	NBC	
1992 (50th)	Candice Bergen	Murphy Brown	Murphy Brown	CBS	
1992 (50th)	Helen Hunt	Jamie Buchman	Mad About You	NBC	
1992 (50th)	Katey Sagal	Peggy Bundy	Married... with Children	Fox	
1993 (51st)
1993 (51st)	Helen Hunt ‡	Jamie Buchman	Mad About You	NBC	
1993 (51st)	Roseanne Barr	Roseanne Conner	Roseanne	ABC	
1993 (51st)	Candice Bergen	Murphy Brown	Murphy Brown	CBS	
1993 (51st)	Patricia Richardson	Jill Taylor	Home Improvement	ABC	
1993 (51st)	Katey Sagal	Peggy Bundy	Married... with Children	Fox	
1994 (52nd)
1994 (52nd)	Helen Hunt ‡	Jamie Buchman	Mad About You	NBC	
1994 (52nd)	Candice Bergen	Murphy Brown	Murphy Brown	CBS	
1994 (52nd)	Brett Butler	Grace Kelly	Grace Under Fire	ABC	
1994 (52nd)	Ellen DeGeneres	Ellen Morgan	Ellen	ABC	
1994 (52nd)	Patricia Richardson	Jill Taylor	Home Improvement	ABC	
1995 (53rd)
1995 (53rd)	Cybill Shepherd ‡	Cybill Sheridan	Cybill	CBS	
1995 (53rd)	Candice Bergen	Murphy Brown	Murphy Brown	CBS	
1995 (53rd)	Ellen DeGeneres	Ellen Morgan	Ellen	ABC	
1995 (53rd)	Fran Drescher	Fran Fine	The Nanny	CBS	
1995 (53rd)	Helen Hunt	Jamie Buchman	Mad About You	NBC	
1996 (54th)
1996 (54th)	Helen Hunt ‡	Jamie Buchman	Mad About You	NBC	
1996 (54th)	Brett Butler	Grace Kelly	Grace Under Fire	ABC	
1996 (54th)	Fran Drescher	Fran Fine	The Nanny	CBS	
1996 (54th)	Cybill Shepherd	Cybill Sheridan	Cybill	CBS	
1996 (54th)	Brooke Shields	Susan Keane	Suddenly Susan	NBC	
1996 (54th)	Tracey Ullman	Various Characters	Tracey Takes On...	HBO	
1997 (55th)
1997 (55th)	Calista Flockhart ‡	Ally McBeal	Ally McBeal	Fox	
1997 (55th)	Kirstie Alley	Veronica Chase	Veronica's Closet	NBC	
1997 (55th)	Ellen DeGeneres	Ellen Morgan	Ellen	ABC	
1997 (55th)	Jenna Elfman	Dharma Montgomery	Dharma & Greg	ABC	
1997 (55th)	Helen Hunt	Jamie Buchman	Mad About You	NBC	
1997 (55th)	Brooke Shields	Susan Keane	Suddenly Susan	NBC	
1998 (56th)
1998 (56th)	Jenna Elfman ‡	Dharma Montgomery	Dharma & Greg	ABC	
1998 (56th)	Christina Applegate	Jesse Warner	Jesse	NBC	
1998 (56th)	Calista Flockhart	Ally McBeal	Ally McBeal	Fox	
1998 (56th)	Laura San Giacomo	Maya Gallo	Just Shoot Me!	NBC	
1998 (56th)	Sarah Jessica Parker	Carrie Bradshaw	Sex and the City	HBO	
1999 (57th)
1999 (57th)	Sarah Jessica Parker ‡	Carrie Bradshaw	Sex and the City	HBO	
1999 (57th)	Jenna Elfman	Dharma Montgomery	Dharma & Greg	ABC	
1999 (57th)	Calista Flockhart	Ally McBeal	Ally McBeal	Fox	
1999 (57th)	Felicity Huffman	Dana Whitaker	Sports Night	ABC	
1999 (57th)	Heather Locklear	Caitlin Moore	Spin City	ABC	
1999 (57th)	Debra Messing	Grace Adler	Will & Grace	NBC	

=== 2000s ===
Year	Actor	Role	Program	Network	Ref
2000 (58th)
2000 (58th)	Sarah Jessica Parker ‡	Carrie Bradshaw	Sex and the City	HBO	
2000 (58th)	Calista Flockhart	Ally McBeal	Ally McBeal	Fox	
2000 (58th)	Jane Kaczmarek	Lois Wilkerson	Malcolm in the Middle	Fox	
2000 (58th)	Debra Messing	Grace Adler	Will & Grace	NBC	
2000 (58th)	Bette Midler	Bette	Bette	CBS	
2001 (59th)
2001 (59th)	Sarah Jessica Parker ‡	Carrie Bradshaw	Sex and the City	HBO	
2001 (59th)	Calista Flockhart	Ally McBeal	Ally McBeal	Fox	
2001 (59th)	Jane Kaczmarek	Lois Wilkerson	Malcolm in the Middle	Fox	
2001 (59th)	Heather Locklear	Caitlin Moore	Spin City	ABC	
2001 (59th)	Debra Messing	Grace Adler	Will & Grace	NBC	
2002 (60th)
2002 (60th)	Jennifer Aniston ‡	Rachel Green	Friends	NBC	
2002 (60th)	Bonnie Hunt	Bonnie Molloy	Life with Bonnie	ABC	
2002 (60th)	Jane Kaczmarek	Lois Wilkerson	Malcolm in the Middle	Fox	
2002 (60th)	Debra Messing	Grace Adler	Will & Grace	NBC	
2002 (60th)	Sarah Jessica Parker	Carrie Bradshaw	Sex and the City	HBO	
2003 (61st)
2003 (61st)	Sarah Jessica Parker ‡	Carrie Bradshaw	Sex and the City	HBO	
2003 (61st)	Bonnie Hunt	Bonnie Molloy	Life with Bonnie	ABC	
2003 (61st)	Reba McEntire	Reba Hart	Reba	The WB	
2003 (61st)	Debra Messing	Grace Adler	Will & Grace	NBC	
2003 (61st)	Bitty Schram	Sharona Fleming	Monk	USA	
2003 (61st)	Alicia Silverstone	Kate Fox	Miss Match	NBC	
2004 (62nd)
2004 (62nd)	Teri Hatcher ‡	Susan Mayer	Desperate Housewives	ABC	
2004 (62nd)	Marcia Cross	Bree Van de Kamp	Desperate Housewives	ABC	
2004 (62nd)	Felicity Huffman	Lynette Scavo	Desperate Housewives	ABC	
2004 (62nd)	Debra Messing	Grace Adler	Will & Grace	NBC	
2004 (62nd)	Sarah Jessica Parker	Carrie Bradshaw	Sex and the City	HBO	
2005 (63rd)
2005 (63rd)	Mary-Louise Parker ‡	Nancy Botwin	Weeds	Showtime	
2005 (63rd)	Marcia Cross	Bree Van de Kamp	Desperate Housewives	ABC	
2005 (63rd)	Teri Hatcher	Susan Mayer	Desperate Housewives	ABC	
2005 (63rd)	Felicity Huffman	Lynette Scavo	Desperate Housewives	ABC	
2005 (63rd)	Eva Longoria	Gabrielle Solis	Desperate Housewives	ABC	
2006 (64th)
2006 (64th)	America Ferrera ‡	Betty Suarez	Ugly Betty	ABC	
2006 (64th)	Marcia Cross	Bree Van de Kamp	Desperate Housewives	ABC	
2006 (64th)	Felicity Huffman	Lynette Scavo	Desperate Housewives	ABC	
2006 (64th)	Julia Louis-Dreyfus	Christine Campbell	The New Adventures of Old Christine	CBS	
2006 (64th)	Mary-Louise Parker	Nancy Botwin	Weeds	Showtime	
2007 (65th)
2007 (65th)	Tina Fey ‡	Liz Lemon	30 Rock	NBC	
2007 (65th)	Christina Applegate	Samantha "Sam" Newly	Samantha Who?	ABC	
2007 (65th)	America Ferrera	Betty Suarez	Ugly Betty	ABC	
2007 (65th)	Anna Friel	Charlotte "Chuck" Charles	Pushing Daisies	ABC	
2007 (65th)	Mary-Louise Parker	Nancy Botwin	Weeds	Showtime	
2008 (66th)
2008 (66th)	Tina Fey ‡	Liz Lemon	30 Rock	NBC	
2008 (66th)	Christina Applegate	Samantha "Sam" Newly	Samantha Who?	ABC	
2008 (66th)	America Ferrera	Betty Suarez	Ugly Betty	ABC	
2008 (66th)	Debra Messing	Molly Kagan	The Starter Wife	USA	
2008 (66th)	Mary-Louise Parker	Nancy Botwin	Weeds	Showtime	
2009 (67th)
2009 (67th)	Toni Collette ‡	Tara Gregson	United States of Tara	Showtime	
2009 (67th)	Courteney Cox	Jules Cobb	Cougar Town	ABC	
2009 (67th)	Edie Falco	Jackie Peyton	Nurse Jackie	Showtime	
2009 (67th)	Tina Fey	Liz Lemon	30 Rock	NBC	
2009 (67th)	Lea Michele	Rachel Berry	Glee	Fox	

=== 2010s ===
Year	Actor	Role	Program	Network	Ref
2010 (68th)
2010 (68th)	Laura Linney ‡	Cathy Jamison	The Big C	Showtime	
2010 (68th)	Toni Collette	Tara Gregson	United States of Tara	Showtime	
2010 (68th)	Edie Falco	Jackie Peyton	Nurse Jackie	Showtime	
2010 (68th)	Tina Fey	Liz Lemon	30 Rock	NBC	
2010 (68th)	Lea Michele	Rachel Berry	Glee	Fox	
2011 (69th)
2011 (69th)	Laura Dern ‡	Amy Jellicoe	Enlightened	HBO	
2011 (69th)	Zooey Deschanel	Jessica Day	New Girl	Fox	
2011 (69th)	Tina Fey	Liz Lemon	30 Rock	NBC	
2011 (69th)	Laura Linney	Cathy Jamison	The Big C	Showtime	
2011 (69th)	Amy Poehler	Leslie Knope	Parks and Recreation	NBC	
2012 (70th)
2012 (70th)	Lena Dunham ‡	Hannah Horvath	Girls	HBO	
2012 (70th)	Zooey Deschanel	Jessica Day	New Girl	Fox	
2012 (70th)	Tina Fey	Liz Lemon	30 Rock	NBC	
2012 (70th)	Julia Louis-Dreyfus	Selina Meyer	Veep	HBO	
2012 (70th)	Amy Poehler	Leslie Knope	Parks and Recreation	NBC	
2013 (71st)
2013 (71st)	Amy Poehler ‡	Leslie Knope	Parks and Recreation	NBC	
2013 (71st)	Zooey Deschanel	Jessica Day	New Girl	Fox	
2013 (71st)	Lena Dunham	Hanna Horvath	Girls	HBO	
2013 (71st)	Edie Falco	Jackie Peyton	Nurse Jackie	Showtime	
2013 (71st)	Julia Louis-Dreyfus	Selina Meyer	Veep	HBO	
2014 (72nd)
2014 (72nd)	Gina Rodriguez ‡	Jane Villanueva	Jane the Virgin	The CW	
2014 (72nd)	Lena Dunham	Hannah Horvath	Girls	HBO	
2014 (72nd)	Edie Falco	Jackie Peyton	Nurse Jackie	Showtime	
2014 (72nd)	Julia Louis-Dreyfus	Selina Meyer	Veep	HBO	
2014 (72nd)	Taylor Schilling	Piper Chapman	Orange is the New Black	Netflix	
2015 (73rd)
2015 (73rd)	Rachel Bloom ‡	Rebecca Bunch	Crazy Ex-Girlfriend	The CW	
2015 (73rd)	Jamie Lee Curtis	Dean Cathy Munsch	Scream Queens	Fox	
2015 (73rd)	Julia Louis-Dreyfus	Selina Meyer	Veep	HBO	
2015 (73rd)	Gina Rodriguez	Jane Villanueva	Jane the Virgin	The CW	
2015 (73rd)	Lily Tomlin	Frankie Bergstein	Grace and Frankie	Netflix	
2016 (74th)
2016 (74th)	Tracee Ellis Ross ‡	Dr. Rainbow "Bow" Johnson	Black-ish	ABC	
2016 (74th)	Rachel Bloom	Rebecca Bunch	Crazy Ex-Girlfriend	The CW	
2016 (74th)	Julia Louis-Dreyfus	Selina Meyer	Veep	HBO	
2016 (74th)	Sarah Jessica Parker	Frances Dufresne	Divorce	HBO	
2016 (74th)	Issa Rae	Issa Dee	Insecure	HBO	
2016 (74th)	Gina Rodriguez	Jane Villanueva	Jane the Virgin	The CW	
2017 (75th)
2017 (75th)	Rachel Brosnahan ‡	Miriam "Midge" Maisel	The Marvelous Mrs. Maisel	Prime Video	
2017 (75th)	Pamela Adlon	Sam Fox	Better Things	FX	
2017 (75th)	Alison Brie	Ruth Wilder	GLOW	Netflix	
2017 (75th)	Issa Rae	Issa Dee	Insecure	HBO	
2017 (75th)	Frankie Shaw	Bridgette Bird	SMILF	Showtime	
2018 (76th)
2018 (76th)	Rachel Brosnahan ‡	Miriam "Midge" Maisel	The Marvelous Mrs. Maisel	Prime Video	
2018 (76th)	Kristen Bell	Eleanor Shellstrop	The Good Place	NBC	
2018 (76th)	Candice Bergen	Murphy Brown	Murphy Brown	CBS	
2018 (76th)	Alison Brie	Ruth Wilder	GLOW	Netflix	
2018 (76th)	Debra Messing	Grace Adler	Will & Grace	NBC	
2019 (77th)
2019 (77th)	Phoebe Waller-Bridge ‡	Fleabag	Fleabag	Prime Video	
2019 (77th)	Christina Applegate	Jen Harding	Dead to Me	Netflix	
2019 (77th)	Rachel Brosnahan	Miriam "Midge" Maisel	The Marvelous Mrs. Maisel	Prime Video	
2019 (77th)	Kirsten Dunst	Krystal Stubbs	On Becoming a God in Central Florida	Showtime	
2019 (77th)	Natasha Lyonne	Nadia Vulvokov	Russian Doll	Netflix	

=== 2020s ===
Year	Actor	Role	Program	Network	Ref
2020 (78th)
2020 (78th)	Catherine O'Hara ‡	Moira Rose	Schitt's Creek	Pop TV	
2020 (78th)	Lily Collins	Emily Cooper	Emily in Paris	Netflix	
2020 (78th)	Kaley Cuoco	Cassie Bowden	The Flight Attendant	HBO Max	
2020 (78th)	Elle Fanning	Catherine the Great	The Great	Hulu	
2020 (78th)	Jane Levy	Zoey Clarke	Zoey's Extraordinary Playlist	NBC	
2021 (79th)
2021 (79th)	Jean Smart ‡	Deborah Vance	Hacks	HBO Max	
2021 (79th)	Hannah Einbinder	Ava Daniels	Hacks	HBO Max	
2021 (79th)	Elle Fanning	Catherine the Great	The Great	Hulu	
2021 (79th)	Issa Rae	Issa Dee	Insecure	HBO	
2021 (79th)	Tracee Ellis Ross	Dr. Rainbow "Bow" Johnson	Black-ish	ABC	
2022 (80th)
2022 (80th)	Quinta Brunson ‡	Janine Teagues	Abbott Elementary	ABC	
2022 (80th)	Kaley Cuoco	Cassie Bowden	The Flight Attendant	HBO Max	
2022 (80th)	Selena Gomez	Mabel Mora	Only Murders in the Building	Hulu	
2022 (80th)	Jenna Ortega	Wednesday Addams	Wednesday	Netflix	
2022 (80th)	Jean Smart	Deborah Vance	Hacks	HBO Max	
2023 (81st)
2023 (81st)	Ayo Edebiri ‡	Sydney Adamu	The Bear	FX	
2023 (81st)	Rachel Brosnahan	Miriam "Midge" Maisel	The Marvelous Mrs. Maisel	Prime Video	
2023 (81st)	Quinta Brunson	Janine Teagues	Abbott Elementary	ABC	
2023 (81st)	Elle Fanning	Catherine the Great	The Great	Hulu	
2023 (81st)	Selena Gomez	Mabel Mora	Only Murders in the Building	Hulu	
2023 (81st)	Natasha Lyonne	Charlie Cale	Poker Face	Peacock	
2024 (82nd)
2024 (82nd)	Jean Smart ‡	Deborah Vance	Hacks	HBO / Max	
2024 (82nd)	Kristen Bell	Joanne	Nobody Wants This	Netflix	
2024 (82nd)	Quinta Brunson	Janine Teagues	Abbott Elementary	ABC	
2024 (82nd)	Ayo Edebiri	Sydney Adamu	The Bear	FX	
2024 (82nd)	Selena Gomez	Mabel Mora	Only Murders in the Building	Hulu	
2024 (82nd)	Kathryn Hahn	Agatha Harkness / Agnes O'Connor	Agatha All Along	Disney+	
2025 (83rd)
2025 (83rd)	Jean Smart ‡	Deborah Vance	Hacks	HBO Max	
2025 (83rd)	Kristen Bell	Joanne	Nobody Wants This	Netflix	
2025 (83rd)	Ayo Edebiri	Sydney Adamu	The Bear	FX	
2025 (83rd)	Selena Gomez	Mabel Mora	Only Murders in the Building	Hulu	
2025 (83rd)	Natasha Lyonne	Charlie Cale	Poker Face	Peacock	
2025 (83rd)	Jenna Ortega	Wednesday Addams	Wednesday	Netflix	

== Superlatives ==
Superlative	Best Actress - Television Series Musical or Comedy
Actress with most awards	Carol Burnett (5)
Actress with most nominations	Carol Burnett (12)
Actress with most nominations without ever winning	Bea Arthur (8); Debra Messing (8)

=== Multiple winners ===
Wins	Name
5	Carol Burnett
4	Sarah Jessica Parker
3	Helen Hunt
3	Cybill Shepherd
3	Jean Smart
2	Candice Bergen
2	Rachel Brosnahan
2	Tina Fey
2	Linda Lavin
2	Mary Tyler Moore
2	Jean Stapleton

=== Multiple nominations ===
Nominations	Name
12	Carol Burnett
9	Candice Bergen
8	Bea Arthur
8	Debra Messing
8	Sarah Jessica Parker
7	Mary Tyler Moore
7	Jean Stapleton
6	Tina Fey
6	Helen Hunt
6	Julia Louis-Dreyfus
5	Kirstie Alley
5	Roseanne Barr
5	Calista Flockhart
5	Isabel Sanford
5	Cybill Shepherd
4	Christina Applegate
4	Rachel Brosnahan
4	Edie Falco
4	Selena Gomez
4	Felicity Huffman
4	Mary-Louise Parker
4	Katey Sagal
4	Jean Smart
4	Tracey Ullman
4	Betty White
3	Debbie Allen
3	Lucille Ball
3	Kristen Bell
3	Quinta Brunson
3	Marcia Cross
3	Jamie Lee Curtis
3	Ellen DeGeneres
3	Zooey Deschanel
3	Lena Dunham
3	Ayo Edebiri
3	Jenna Elfman
3	Elle Fanning
3	America Ferrera
3	Jane Kaczmarek
3	Linda Lavin
3	Natasha Lyonne
3	Penny Marshall
3	Rue McClanahan
3	Amy Poehler
3	Issa Rae
3	Gina Rodriguez
2	Loni Anderson
2	Rachel Bloom
2	Eileen Brennan
2	Alison Brie
2	Brett Butler
2	Nell Carter
2	Toni Collette
2	Kaley Cuoco
2	Fran Drescher
2	Bonnie Franklin
2	Estelle Getty
2	Valerie Harper
2	Teri Hatcher
2	Bonnie Hunt
2	Shirley Jones
2	Laura Linney
2	Heather Locklear
2	Shelley Long
2	Lea Michele
2	Jenna Ortega
2	Patricia Richardson
2	Tracee Ellis Ross
2	Brooke Shields
2	Loretta Swit

== See also ==
- TCA Award for Individual Achievement in Comedy
- Critics' Choice Television Award for Best Actress in a Comedy Series
- Primetime Emmy Award for Outstanding Lead Actress in a Comedy Series
- Screen Actors Guild Award for Outstanding Performance by a Female Actor in a Comedy Series
