= The Book of Kevin =

- The Leftovers episode
- Episode no.: Season 3 Episode 1
- Directed by: Mimi Leder
- Written by: Damon Lindelof; Patrick Somerville
- Cinematography by: Michael Grady
- Editing by: David Eisenberg
- Production code: T13.19801
- Original air date: April 16, 2017
- Running time: 64 minutes

Guest appearances
- Jasmin Savoy Brown as Evangeline "Evie" Murphy; Michael Gaston as Dean; Jason Douglas as Jed; Alexandra Schepisi as The Woman

Episode chronology
← Previous "I Live Here Now"	Next → "Don't Be Ridiculous"

"The Book of Kevin" is the first episode of the third season of the American supernatural drama television series The Leftovers, based on the novel of the same name by Tom Perrotta. It is the 21st overall episode of the series and was written by series creator Damon Lindelof and supervising producer Patrick Somerville, and directed by executive producer Mimi Leder. It was first broadcast on HBO in the United States on April 16, 2017.

In the episode, Kevin is now the Chief of Police in Jarden, although he still questions his own mortality after surviving so many death scenarios.

According to Nielsen Media Research, the episode was seen by an estimated 0.895 million household viewers and gained a 0.4 ratings share among adults aged 18–49. The episode received critical acclaim, with critics praising the prologue, performances, writing, new storylines, themes and curiosity surrounding the final scene.

== Plot ==
=== Prologue ===
In 1844, a professed prophet tells his congregation in a rural town that the Rapture will occur in January, which proves false. He repeats the prediction for April, and then again for August, the latter date coinciding with a storm, but the congregation is continually disappointed with the false predictions and, as a result, membership dwindles. A woman in white clothing, one of the remaining congregants, spent the night on a rooftop waiting for the Rapture in the storm. She comes down to rest, walks past her husband and son who no longer share her faith, and lies down in the church with the few remaining members.

=== Present day ===
In the aftermath of the attack on Miracle, the Guilty Remnant occupy the Jarden visitor's center. Meg (Liv Tyler) and Evie (Jasmin Savoy Brown) talk about Meg's ideology. Noticing a wire camera being inserted through the outside door, Evie runs outside, finding authorities fleeing the area. She looks up and sees a drone overflying the area, which launches a missile headed towards the visitor's center. A shocked Evie closes her eyes before the missile strikes, killing her and all the GR members inside.

Three years later, Jarden is now open to the public. Officially the GR died due to a gas leak and explosion inside the visitor's center, and the large blast crator remains. Kevin (Justin Theroux) is now the police chief in Jarden, with Tom (Chris Zylka) also serving as a police officer and Nora (Carrie Coon) returning to her DSD job. John (Kevin Carroll) has married Laurie (Amy Brenneman), and poses as a mentalist, with Laurie telling him what to say through an earbud. During a birthday party for Tom, Jill (Margaret Qualley) visits the family from college. It is revealed that Lily is no longer with Kevin and Nora. One day, Kevin is visited by Dean (Michael Gaston), who claims that dogs are taking human form and assuming government positions, but Kevin dismisses his claims which disappoints Dean.

Questioning his mortality, Kevin tries to kill himself by suffocating with a plastic bag. After leaving the house (whether he removed the bag or again died and returned) he is called to the lake, where a group of protesters polluted the Jarden springs in the name of the GR. As the police try to control the situation, Kevin shocks everyone by jumping into the lake, telling them the water is fine. Michael (Jovan Adepo) then baptizes Kevin in the water, in front of the crowd. Later Tom drives with Kevin and they are shot at by Dean, which causes Tom to crash the car. As Dean is about to kill Kevin, Tom shoots Dean dead.

Later, Kevin finds that Mary (Janel Moloney) is planning to move back to Mapleton with her son Noah, citing Matt's (Christopher Eccleston) restricting beliefs that she will return to her coma if she leaves Jarden. She also informs Kevin that Matt is writing a gospel about him, fascinated by his resurrection. Kevin confronts Matt, who was working with Michael and John on the gospel. They are convinced that Kevin is a Christ-like figure, seeing that he survived so many possible death scenarios, with a role to play in the coming anniversary of the Departure. Kevin takes the book with the gospel and prepares to burn it, but apparently stops.

=== Flashforward ===
In rural Australia, an unspecified number of years in the future, a woman takes some of her pigeons from a house and rides a bike to a local church, providing the pigeons to a community center. A nun gives money for the service to the woman, named Sarah. The nun asks if she knows a person named Kevin. The camera reveals that "Sarah" is actually an older, gray haired Nora. Nora replies, "no".

== Production ==
=== Development ===
In March 2017, the episode's title was revealed as "The Book of Kevin" and it was announced that series creator Damon Lindelof and supervising producer Patrick Somerville had written the episode while executive producer Mimi Leder had directed it. This was Lindelof's twentieth writing credit, Somerville's third writing credit, and Leder's eighth directing credit.

=== Writing ===
Like "Axis Mundi", the episode also started with a prologue set in the past. The scene was inspired by the Great Disappointment, a reaction by the Millerite movement when the prophecies of the arrival of the Apocalypse in October 1844 did not happen. Perrotta brought up the idea of the Great Disappointment after reading a book, with Lindelof also finding its connection to the series' theme by tying it to Australia, a prominent place in the season. As part of research, Lindelof had the writers read When Prophecy Fails, feeling that the concept of people continuously failing in predicting the end of the world was "a cognitive dissonance, and that became an interesting idea." Lindelof also explained, ""We're not being ambiguous for ambiguity's sake. We have a very specific intention. I do think that by the end of the first episode of the show, it's no secret that we told you a story about a group of people who clearly thought that the world was going to end on a specific date and then it didn't, and what the consequences are of that belief system failing them."

Regarding the ending, Lindelof explained, "One of the things we wanted to do in choosing to end the first episode the way that we did was create a little bit of comfort for the audience and show them where we were going. There's no desire to actively troll the audience. So our intention of ending Episode 1 the way that we did was to alleviate a little of the tension of, 'How is the series going to end?' by beginning the ending in that very first episode."

== Reception ==
=== Viewers ===
The episode was watched by 0.895 million viewers, earning a 0.4 in the 18-49 rating demographics on the Nielson ratings scale. This means that 0.4 percent of all households with televisions watched the episode. This was a 10% decrease from the previous episode, which was watched by 0.993 million viewers with a 0.5 in the 18-49 demographics.

=== Critical reviews ===
"The Book of Kevin" received critical acclaim. The review aggregator website Rotten Tomatoes reported a 100% approval rating with an average rating of 9/10 for the episode, based on 14 reviews. The site's consensus states: "Tense, evocative, and packed with strong performances, 'The Book of Kevin' exemplifies why The Leftovers is among the best of HBO's recent series."

Matt Fowler of IGN gave the episode a "great" 8.8 out of 10 and wrote in his verdict, "The Leftovers jump starts its final season with a time jump, a flash-forward, and a gorgeous and clever tale about a possible End Times scenario. A potential apocalypse that, perhaps, doesn't adhere to all the rules and regulations that people would like it to. The characters are rich and rewarding, the music delightfully sets the stage, and the story oozes freshness and fierceness. The Leftovers inhabits such a wonderful space, showcases cracking confidence, and exhibits perfect pitch."

Joshua Alston of The A.V. Club gave the episode an "A" grade and wrote, "Once again, the Leftovers team outdid itself with an opening so mesmerizing, human, and evocative, it almost seems like they've done themselves a disservice by coming so hot out of the gate."

Alan Sepinwall of Uproxx wrote, "I can't wait to see what brought Nora here — even if, based on her new identity and her expression when she hears Kevin’s name, she's surely lived a hard life between then and now. That's how much faith The Leftovers has generated within me over these two-plus seasons." Jeff Labrecque of Entertainment Weekly wrote, "'The Book of Kevin' was a terrific bolt of a premiere, reframing everything's that happened in two seasons, shuffling some of the essential relationships, and doubling down on clues that once seemed too preposterous to be anything more than the ravings of a lunatic. I'm happy to play the role of the Millerite woman for seven more episodes."

Sean T. Collins of Vulture gave the episode a 4 star rating out of 5 and wrote, "Comedy, tragedy, horror, symbolism: The Leftovers fires them at you one after the other and doesn't much care whether you're able to field them." Nick Harley of Den of Geek gave the episode a 4 star rating out of 5 and wrote, "As I said in my spoiler-free review, I spent more time thinking about The Leftovers since it's been off the air than any other show. Unafraid to lean into unconventional ideas while also letting the mystery be, the series features devastatingly realistic performances, characters that unravel in the most interesting ways, and a tone that effortlessly shifts from hopeless to humorous at the drop of dime. I'm so glad that The Leftovers is back and can't wait to hear that spine-tingling score soundtrack the next jaw-dropping moment."

Matt Brennan of Paste gave the episode a 9.2 out of 10 wrote, "'The Book of Kevin', yet another in The Leftovers' string of extraordinary episodes, is an attempt to chalk the lines of this painful longing, this profound sense of loss; it moves with awful power between the stories with which we salve our wounds and the recognition that there is no satisfying grief, only surviving it." Noel Murray of The New York Times wrote, "Sunday's episode, titled 'The Book of Kevin', is an atypical chapter for this series, because it doesn't tell one complete story the way the best Leftovers episodes do. It's more concerned with catching viewers up with what everyone has been doing since the Season 2 finale, and then creating some new problems that are likely to drive the action in the remaining weeks."
