= A Most Powerful Adversary =

- The Leftovers episode
- Episode no.: Season 2 Episode 7
- Directed by: Mimi Leder
- Written by: Damon Lindelof; Patrick Somerville
- Cinematography by: Todd McMullen
- Editing by: David Eisenberg
- Production code: 4X6057
- Original air date: November 15, 2015
- Running time: 57 minutes

Guest appearance
- Steven Williams as Virgil

Episode chronology
← Previous "Lens"	Next → "International Assassin"

"A Most Powerful Adversary" is the seventh episode of the second season of the American supernatural drama television series The Leftovers, based on the novel of the same name by Tom Perrotta. It is the seventeenth overall episode of the series and was written by series creator Damon Lindelof and co-producer Patrick Somerville, and directed by executive producer Mimi Leder. It was first broadcast on HBO in the United States on November 15, 2015.

In the episode, Kevin's hallucinations of Patti disrupt his life, causing Nora to flee her house with Lily and Mary. He seeks Virgil's help, realizing they previously met.

According to Nielsen Media Research, the episode was seen by an estimated 0.610 million household viewers and gained a 0.3 ratings share among adults aged 18–49. The episode received critical acclaim, with critics expressing surprise with the ending, feeling that it could change the course of the series.

== Plot ==
Kevin (Justin Theroux) wakes up handcuffed to his bed, discovering that Nora (Carrie Coon) and Lily are not in the house. As Jill (Margaret Qualley) finds him, they find a note from Nora. Despite Kevin's plea not to read it, Jill does it, with the letter stating that she took Lily and Mary and left, telling him not to call her. She throws him a pair of bolt cutters but then angrily storms out, while Patti (Ann Dowd) taunts Kevin for losing his family.

As he wanders through the city to find a locksmith to remove the cuff and severed chain, Kevin asks Patti what she wants from him, to which she says that she has no idea. Suddenly, Michael (Jovan Adepo) joins Kevin in his truck, revealing that they met before and is aware of Patti's appearances. Michael claims that Kevin visited Virgil (Steven Williams) on the night he arrived in Miracle, something he cannot remember. He takes him to Virgil, who explains that Patti is his adversary and Kevin must fight her to get rid of her. However, the only way that Kevin can fight her is in the realm of the undead, which he can only go by dying. Kevin tried to do it by tying a cinder block to his ankle and drowning in the lake, but the earthquake draining the lake prevented his death. A confused Kevin leaves him, shocked at the discovery.

Kevin is called to the entrance to Miracle, where Laurie (Amy Brenneman) has arrived. Laurie believes that Tom is in town, although Kevin claims he has not seen him in over a year. Realizing that Tom left her, Kevin erratically questions what did she do to cause Tom to leave, causing her to leave in shame. He visits John (Kevin Carroll) for help in removing the handcuff, who agrees to help him with a cutter if he gives his palm print to compare it to the ones found on the girls' car the night they disappeared. However, the cutters are missing, preventing Kevin from getting the handcuff off.

After being confronted by Jill for driving Nora away, Kevin visits Laurie at her motel room. He opens up to her, explaining that he sees Patti in his mind. Laurie notes that Patti does not appear when she is with Kevin, suggesting that Kevin may struggle to differentiate reality. He convinces her to stay with him at their house, despite Jill's disapproval. Kevin is called again by Nora, asking him to stop calling and revealing she left a note revealing that the key was under his pillow, which was blocked from his vision by Patti. Kevin makes Nora promise that she could return if he stops seeing Patti.

Kevin drives to Virgil's home trailer, just as Michael was leaving. Virgil gives Kevin a poison, telling him he will inject him with epinephrine within 5 minutes of his "death" to revive him. Despite Patti protesting, Kevin drinks the poison and collapses to the floor, dead. Virgil then takes the syringe of epinephrine and disposes of it onto the floor. He then places a revolver in his mouth and pulls the trigger, killing himself. Michael enters the trailer and amidst shock and sadness, pulls Kevin's body out of the trailer.

== Production ==
=== Development ===
In November 2015, the episode's title was revealed as "A Most Powerful Adversary" and it was announced that series creator Damon Lindelof and co-producer Patrick Somerville had written the episode while executive producer Mimi Leder had directed it. This was Lindelof's sixteenth writing credit, Somerville's second writing credit, and Leder's sixth directing credit.

=== Writing ===
Justin Theroux was not informed in advance of his character's death, as he reads the scripts in the order they arrive, without a clue of what will happen next. The script wanted to affirm his character's fate, which was described as "Kevin is dead — really, really dead." Damon Lindelof described the future of the character, "You will see Kevin, or parts of Kevin, possibly memories of Kevin, Kevin's jogging pants, Maybe another character named Kevin, an adolescent game entitled 'Seven Minutes in Kevin,' and/or, but not necessarily literally, the ACTUAL Kevin, again. And soon."

== Reception ==
=== Viewers ===
The episode was watched by 0.610 million viewers, earning a 0.3 in the 18-49 rating demographics on the Nielson ratings scale. This means that 0.3 percent of all households with televisions watched the episode. This was a slight decrease from the previous episode, which was watched by 0.636 million viewers with a 0.3 in the 18-49 demographics.

=== Critical reviews ===
"A Most Powerful Adversary" received critical acclaim. The review aggregator website Rotten Tomatoes reported a 100% approval rating with an average rating of 8.93/10 for the episode, based on 11 reviews. The site's consensus states: "'A Most Powerful Adversary' delivers a shocking twist ending to a superb episode of The Leftovers."

Matt Fowler of IGN gave the episode a perfect "masterpiece" 10 out of 10 and wrote in his verdict, "'A Most Powerful Adversary', like most great Leftovers episodes, answered questions while immediately raising more. Keeping the chain of intrigue flowing. And here, thanks to a top-of-the-line performance by Justin Theroux, Kevin's issues started to take more of a relatable shape. A malevolent shape. An 'IT' type shape, actually. A presence that, more of less, starts to put Patti in the same type of category as Satan, though she herself scoffed at the idea of directing Kevin down any particular path. This was Kevin at his worst, but also his best. Cursed and afflicted, but also determined not to let his family crumble apart (again). Realizing that his asleep-self didn't want to end it all, like Patti insisted, helped drive him toward that last-ditch solution."

Joshua Alston of The A.V. Club gave the episode a "B+" grade and wrote, "The ending of 'A Most Powerful Adversary' is very much a television cliffhanger, and the kind that almost never feels earned because it relies so heavily on information the audience doesn't already have. For those completely invested in The Leftovers, it's a final note that leaves you desperate for the next installment. But for those teetering on defection, which I'd imagine is a statistically significant portion of the audience, 'Adversary' could constitute the final straw."

Alan Sepinwall of HitFix wrote, "Recent television has created such intense cliffhanger fatigue that I would have rolled my eyes at a lot of shows that ended an episode with the main character dying of poison and being dragged off to parts unknown. But like Kevin with Virgil, I'm putting all my trust into The Leftovers. After I've gone this far on this mad journey, what other choice do I have?" Jeff Labrecque of Entertainment Weekly wrote, "The show now rests in the hands of Michael, who seems to have a lot to unpack in the final three episodes. What are his secrets? Does he have a most powerful adversary? After all, it runs in his family, too. Or is his hidden companion someone more benevolent, someone with a preternatural link to him... like Evie?"

Kelly Braffet of Vulture gave the episode a 4 star rating out of 5 and wrote, "The Leftovers explores how we live with the unknowable, and it's doing so with great characters and fantastic writing and across-the-board stellar performances." Nick Harley of Den of Geek gave the episode a 4 star rating out of 5 and wrote, "There's much that's left to be discovered this season and with just three episodes left, I'd expect the coming episodes to match this one in terms of intensity. Last year, The Leftovers solidified itself as a drama to watch in its last two episodes, so perhaps they'll repeat the trend and knock us out with the last two hours once again. I expect a lot of things, but answers aren't one of them, and somehow I'm ok with that."

Robert Ham of Paste gave the episode a 9.6 out of 10 wrote, "Unlike Game of Thrones, this wasn't in a book already and wasn't something that the super fans saw coming. This came out of nowhere and, if you're a dutiful watcher of The Leftovers, should have left you shaken." Jen Chaney of The New York Times wrote, "'A Most Powerful Adversary', while a perfectly good episode of The Leftovers, feels like a slight comedown after the perfectly pitched ones that preceded it. Perhaps that's because it forces us to spend so much time with Kevin, who, let's be honest, can be a major drag."
