= G'Day Melbourne =

- The Leftovers episode
- Episode no.: Season 3 Episode 4
- Directed by: Daniel Sackheim
- Story by: Damon Lindelof
- Teleplay by: Tamara P. Carter; Haley Harris
- Cinematography by: Robert Humphreys
- Editing by: David Eisenberg
- Production code: T13.19804
- Original air date: May 7, 2017
- Running time: 55 minutes

Guest appearances
- Lindsay Duncan as Grace Playford; Jasmin Savoy Brown as Evangeline "Evie" Murphy; Katja Herbers as Dr. Eden

Episode chronology
← Previous "Crazy Whitefella Thinking"	Next → "It's a Matt, Matt, Matt, Matt World"

"G'Day Melbourne" is the fourth episode of the third season of the American supernatural drama television series The Leftovers, based on the novel of the same name by Tom Perrotta. It is the 24th overall episode of the series and was written by Tamara P. Carter and Haley Harris from a story by series creator Damon Lindelof, and directed by Daniel Sackheim. It was first broadcast on HBO in the United States on May 7, 2017.

In the episode, Kevin and Nora arrive at Australia, where things start falling apart between them.

According to Nielsen Media Research, the episode was seen by an estimated 0.846 million household viewers and gained a 0.4 ratings share among adults aged 18–49. The episode received critical acclaim, with critics praising the performances, writing, emotional tone, pacing, directing and cinematography.

== Plot ==
While on the plane to Australia, Kevin (Justin Theroux) deduces that DSD is not involved in their destination, and questions why Nora (Carrie Coon) needs to meet with Mark Linn-Baker, but Nora brushes it off. As they arrive in Melbourne, Nora reads Kevin's gospel, mocking its content. Per the scientists' instructions, Nora must go to a bus stop by herself, leaving Kevin in the hotel room. While watching TV, Kevin is confused when he sees Evie (Jasmin Savoy Brown) during a live broadcast of "G'Day Melbourne". He leaves for the location of the show in Federation Square in order to find her.

Kevin finds Evie, who claims that her name is Daniah and that she doesn't know him. A man steps up to protect her from Kevin's aggression, headbutts Kevin, and the woman leaves. Kevin calls Laurie (Amy Brenneman), who is shocked to discover she is alive, but advises him not to pursue Evie further. Kevin ignores the advice and locates Evie at the State Library Victoria. She confesses to being Evie, but then claims that Kevin is ill and Laurie instructed her to tell him she was Evie. Calling Laurie again, Kevin is told that he is projecting Evie onto another woman, which he realizes after checking her photo again, now a different woman. The woman, clearly not Evie, leaves.

Nora takes a bus to Kensington, Victoria, where she is greeted by physicists Drs. Eden (Katja Herbers) and Bekker (Victoria Haralabidou). She is subjected to some tests and questioning, the latter of which leads to skepticism from Bekker. To determine whether or not Nora can continue with the process the doctors ask her a question: two kids are born and one will discover the cure for cancer only if the other baby is killed at birth, would she let one baby die a quick death if the other could cure cancer. Nora answers yes, claiming that kids die every day. The doctors then decide that Nora is not suitable for their plan and they leave despite Nora's pleas.

That night, Kevin returns to the hotel, finding Nora in a manic state after being rejected from the process. Kevin is not willing to share his problems, as Nora left him before after he told her he was seeing Patti. They begin to argue and Nora accuses Kevin of liking Matt's book. This prompts Kevin to burn the gospel. Nora asks Kevin why he didn't stop her from giving Lily back to Christine, Kevin replied that she never even asked him, and he also tells her that she refuses to have another child now because people would no longer feel sorry for her. Nora maintains that her children aren't dead, just gone. Kevin then coldly tells her to be with them, and leaves the room just as the fire activates the sprinklers. Kevin tries to get a taxi, only to find chaos in the streets from an explosion. Kevin Sr. (Scott Glenn) appears, having recognized Kevin Jr. on "G'Day Melbourne" when he went to go look for Evie. He and Grace (Lindsay Duncan) drive Kevin away from the hotel, while Nora stays in the room.

== Production ==
=== Development ===
In March 2017, the episode's title was revealed as "G'Day Melbourne" and it was announced that Tamara P. Carter and Haley Harris had written the episode from a story by series creator Damon Lindelof while Daniel Sackheim had directed it. This was Carter's first writing credit, Harris' first writing credit, Lindelof's 23rd writing credit, and Sackheim's second directing credit.

== Reception ==
=== Viewers ===
The episode was watched by 0.812 million viewers, earning a 0.3 in the 18-49 rating demographics on the Nielson ratings scale. This means that 0.3 percent of all households with televisions watched the episode. This was a slight decrease from the previous episode, which was watched by 0.846 million viewers with a 0.4 in the 18-49 demographics.

=== Critical reviews ===
"G'Day Melbourne" received critical acclaim. The review aggregator website Rotten Tomatoes reported a 100% approval rating with an average rating of 8.67/10 for the episode, based on 16 reviews. The site's consensus states: "The power of grieving, broken love is the theme of 'G'Day Melbourne', which further explores a profound mystery of biblical proportions."

Matt Fowler of IGN gave the episode a perfect "masterpiece" 10 out of 10 and wrote in his verdict, "The Leftovers excelled with its disintegration of Nora and Kevin's relationship - this time using a big change of scenery to exacerbate their issues instead of mending them with a 'miracle town'. Carrie Coon and Justin Theroux were magnificent in their respective panics and plights as Nora gave in to her 'cursed' moniker and Kevin spiraled in ways only Kevin could spiral."

Joshua Alston of The A.V. Club gave the episode an "A–" grade and wrote, "Love stories, even the most life-affirming ones, are full of doubt, crossed signals, longing, and resentment. And so too is Kevin and Nora's love story, which hits its roughest patch yet in 'G'Day Melbourne'."

Alan Sepinwall of Uproxx wrote, "Nobody likes it when Mommy and Daddy fight, but nobody expects them to fight this dirty, no matter how much pain they're each in." Jeff Labrecque of Entertainment Weekly wrote, "And if this catastrophe happened this way, how much did Kevin have to do with it? Did his anger set things off? Or did fate intervene again — like the earthquake that saved him from drowning — and send him to Australia specifically to keep him safe? The Leftovers writing room works in mysterious ways."

Sean T. Collins of Vulture gave the episode a 4 star rating out of 5 and wrote, "I wouldn't be surprised if we look back on 'G'Day Melbourne', tonight's episode of The Leftovers, and conclude that not showing us the explosion that brought society to a standstill was the smartest thing it did." Nick Harley of Den of Geek wrote, "This was an emotionally draining episode of The Leftovers, featuring raw, electrifying turns from Justin Theroux and Carrie Coon and piercing direction from Daniel Sackheim, who delivers a final shot of Nora, water streaming down her eyelids, that feels like a series defining image. The love is over, but our time with The Leftovers thankfully isn't, at least not yet."

Matt Brennan of Paste gave the episode an 8.5 out of 10 wrote, "The episode's musical through line, a-ha's 'Take On Me', blares from a few forthright horns, and The Leftovers finds the last remaining link between Nora and Kevin: their desperate need to escape." Noel Murray of The New York Times wrote, "It doesn't take long before a sense of queasy dread creeps into this week's episode of The Leftovers and takes a permanent hold."
