= No Room at the Inn (The Leftovers) =

- The Leftovers episode
- Episode no.: Season 2 Episode 5
- Directed by: Nicole Kassell
- Written by: Damon Lindelof; Jacqueline Hoyt
- Cinematography by: Todd McMullen
- Editing by: Henk Van Eeghen
- Production code: 4X6055
- Original air date: November 1, 2015
- Running time: 56 minutes

Guest appearances
- Sam Littlefield as Almer; Brett Butler as Sandy

Episode chronology
← Previous "Orange Sticker"	Next → "Lens"

"No Room at the Inn" is the fifth episode of the second season of the American supernatural drama television series The Leftovers, based on the novel of the same name by Tom Perrotta. It is the fifteenth overall episode of the series and was written by series creator Damon Lindelof and co-executive producer Jacqueline Hoyt, and directed by Nicole Kassell. It was first broadcast on HBO in the United States on November 1, 2015.

In the episode, Matt takes Mary out of Miracle for an MRI scan in Austin, Texas, where he is surprised by a discovery.

According to Nielsen Media Research, the episode was seen by an estimated 0.625 million household viewers and gained a 0.3 ratings share among adults aged 18–49. The episode received critical acclaim, with Christopher Eccleston's performance receiving universal acclaim.

== Plot ==
Matt (Christopher Eccleston) follows the same routine with Mary (Janel Moloney) every day, hoping they can recapture her temporary recovery. As days pass and nothing happens, Matt begins to feel desperate. He decides to take her to Austin, Texas for an MRI scan. At the clinic, he is shocked when he discovers that Mary is pregnant. As the hospital had to give her a special treatment since Matt wasn't aware of her pregnancy, he is informed he will have to accept liability, to which a happy Matt agrees.

While returning to Miracle, Matt stops to help a man and his son with a car breakdown. However the man hits Matt with a wrench, stealing Matt's and Mary's wristbands which will allow the father and son to enter Miracle without problem. In his dazed state Matt suddenly sees Mary talking, telling him that the baby will not survive unless they re-enter Miracle. She returns to her catatonic state, with Matt determined to take them back to Miracle. However, the man cut the car's engine, forcing Matt to take Mary on her wheelchair.

Matt and Mary are denied access due to their lack of wristbands, although the officer allows them to enter the visitor's center to get replacements. Matt's replacement wristband is denied and he gets into a fight with an impatient man who insults Mary. Kevin (Justin Theroux) and John (Kevin Carroll) pick him up from detention. John confronts Matt over his role over her pregnancy, claiming Mary did not consent to sex, refusing to believe that she had recovered. As Kevin is a new resident and John will refuse to sponsor him, Matt and Mary are denied access to wristbands.

At a refugee camp outside Miracle, a Swedish man offers Matt help in sneaking in, but demands $1,000. With no money, Matt asks a woman for help. The woman agrees to pay him if he hits a willing man with an oar as hard as possible. With a crowd watching, Matt hits the man, breaking the oar with the impact and knocking him unconscious. While the total is not $1,000, the Swedish man still agrees to help Matt, instructing Matt him to sneak into town through a drainpipe. As Matt and Mary attempt to enter Miracle through the drainpipe a thunderstorm causes flooding, resulting in Matt and Mary washing back to the camp.

Kevin and Nora (Carrie Coon) meet with Matt in the camp. They place Matt and Mary in their car's trunk, sneaking them inside Miracle, seizing that the authorities are preoccupied with a possible sighting of Evie and her friends. As they drive, they stop when they see a car crash, where a man died. Matt discovers that the man was the person who robbed his wristbands. He notices the son nearby, who is offering his wristband. With a change of heart, Matt gives up his wristband to the boy, taking him to the town while Kevin and Nora take Mary with her wristband. Confronted once again by John, Matt reaffirms that Mary woke up in Miracle, which he will always maintain. He then hands the boy to John, telling him he will not return until Mary awakens and prove that her miraculous recovery happened. He returns to the refugee camp where he decides to free a naked man who has been locked in a pillory. In order to do so, a naked Matt will have to take his place, which he does.

== Production ==
=== Development ===
In October 2015, the episode's title was revealed as "No Room at the Inn" and it was announced that series creator Damon Lindelof and co-executive producer Jacqueline Hoyt had written the episode while Nicole Kassell had directed it. This was Lindelof's fourteenth writing credit, Hoyt's fourth writing credit, and Kassell's first directing credit.

== Reception ==
=== Viewers ===
The episode was watched by 0.625 million viewers, earning a 0.3 in the 18-49 rating demographics on the Nielson ratings scale. This means that 0.3 percent of all households with televisions watched the episode. This was a 20% increase from the previous episode, which was watched by 0.519 million viewers with a 0.3 in the 18-49 demographics.

=== Critical reviews ===
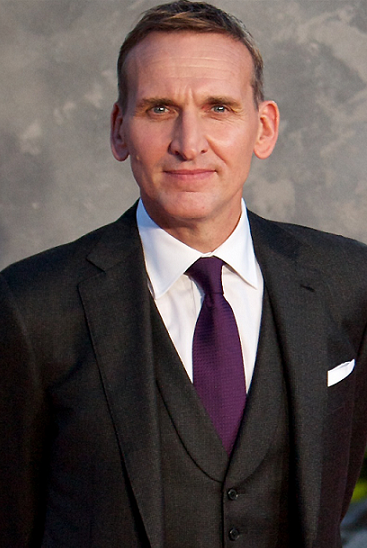
Christopher Eccleston received universal acclaim for his performance in the episode.

"No Room at the Inn" received critical acclaim. The review aggregator website Rotten Tomatoes reported a 100% approval rating with an average rating of 9.4/10 for the episode, based on 10 reviews. The site's consensus states: "'No Room at the Inn' is one of The Leftovers' most provocative episodes to date, showcasing Christopher Eccleston's ability to bring his character's moral complexity to life."

Matt Fowler of IGN gave the episode an "amazing" 9.3 out of 10 and wrote in his verdict, "'No Room at the Inn' wasn't as shattering as last season's Matt episode simply because it wasn't our first time watching Matt's life get shattered. These were familiar beats. Superb beats, but recognizable. Though this episode certainly wasn't lacking in imagination for all the things it hurled at Matt. Including, most importantly, Mary's pregnancy. A thing he'd always wanted now coming back in a less-than-ideal way. Again, very Monkey's Paw. A 'blessing' that now stands to alienate Matt from his own family and the town. At least Mary's now with Nora, who's the one person most likely to buy Matt's story. Especially since he'd already told (most of) it to her. Matt episodes are always going to be about pushing through hardships in order to find... more hardships. But then also learning to see the good in those hardships."

Joshua Alston of The A.V. Club gave the episode an "A–" grade and wrote, "The episode is beautifully conceived and bravely acted as usual, but the show is definitely hitting the ceiling in terms of how many separate stories it can focus on. If The Leftovers is going to continue to be this elegiac, it has to be focused."

Alan Sepinwall of HitFix wrote, "Like so many hours of this great second season, 'No Room at the Inn' was unyielding in its focus not only on a single character, but one so in the grips of a form of mania that it becomes hard to watch the episode and not feel gripped by it yourself." Jeff Labrecque of Entertainment Weekly wrote, "'No Room at the Inn' is Matt's season 2 showcase, and it digs even deeper into the minister's strengths and flaws, his better angels and demons."

Kelly Braffet of Vulture gave the episode a perfect 5 star rating out of 5 and wrote, "Matt really wants to believe that the world is good... He believes so firmly that he'll find redemption that I always find myself wanting to believe he will, too. Somehow." Nick Harley of Den of Geek gave the episode a 4 star rating out of 5 and wrote, "Once again, The Leftovers presents an hour focused on one member of their ensemble cast, and once again, the show is better for it. I think that says a lot about the characters that Tom Perrotta and Damon Lindelof have created, we can spend extended periods of time isolated away from other stories and not be bored or anxious for other characters to appear; we cherish the time spent with the characters that we are given."

Robert Ham of Paste gave the episode an 8.7 out of 10 wrote, "One of England's best character actors, he is perfect throughout, bringing to life that strange alien-like presence that so many men raised in strict religious households carry with them. They are almost encouraged to act like they aren't of this world. Watching Eccleston embody that almost makes cheering him forward up the ladder and into the stocks worth it. Almost." Jen Chaney of The New York Times wrote, "Sunday's The Leftovers was the most compelling hour so far of season two, and that's a bold statement considering how outstanding the second season has been."

=== Accolades ===
TVLine named Christopher Eccleston as an honorable mention as the "Performer of the Week" for the week of November 7, 2015, for his performance in the episode. The site wrote, "With his unresponsive, wheelchair-bound wife and his religious zealotry, The Leftovers' Matt has never exactly had an easy time of it. But even his unshakable faith was tested by the calamities that befell him in 'No Room at the Inn.' As the reverend careened from jubilation to indignation and finally desperation, Christopher Eccleston opened a window to Matt's feelings through which we almost didn't want to look, they were so painful and exhausting. As the episode ended, though Matt didn't seem to think that he'd earned a break — he'd replaced a man who'd been shackled in the tourist trap just outside of Miracle — we were convinced that his portrayer had at the very least earned an Honorable Mention."
