= Ten Thirteen (The Leftovers) =

- The Leftovers episode
- Episode no.: Season 2 Episode 9
- Directed by: Keith Gordon
- Written by: Damon Lindelof; Monica Beletsky
- Cinematography by: Todd McMullen
- Editing by: Michael Ruscio
- Production code: 4X6059
- Original air date: November 29, 2015
- Running time: 54 minutes

Guest appearances
- Jasmin Savoy Brown as Evangeline "Evie" Murphy; Darius McCrary as Isaac; Betty Buckley as Jane; Bill Heck as Darren; Adina Porter as a G.R. Leader

Episode chronology
← Previous "International Assassin"	Next → "I Live Here Now"

"Ten Thirteen" is the ninth episode of the second season of the American supernatural drama television series The Leftovers, based on the novel of the same name by Tom Perrotta. It is the nineteenth overall episode of the series and was written by series creator Damon Lindelof and supervising producer Monica Beletsky, and directed by Keith Gordon. It was first broadcast on HBO in the United States on November 29, 2015.

In the episode, Meg's past is explored, along with her motives as she questions the authority of the Guilty Remnant.

According to Nielsen Media Research, the episode was seen by an estimated 0.861 million household viewers and gained a 0.4 ratings share among adults aged 18–49. The episode received critical acclaim, with critics praising Liv Tyler's performance, character development, pacing and ending.

== Plot ==
=== Flashback ===
On October 13, 2011, the day before the Sudden Departure, Meg (Liv Tyler) talks with her mother, Jane (Betty Buckley), in a restaurant. Meg has a drug habit, snorting cocaine before their meeting. Jane wants to pay for her wedding, although Meg does not want her to do it. Feeling anxious, she returns to the bathroom to snort cocaine before Jane tells her something. When she returns, she finds Jane has collapsed and died.

Two years later, Meg and her fiancé Darren (Bill Heck) visit Miracle on a tour Meg booked because she heard there was a fortune teller in town. Meg visits Isaac (Darius McCrary) in order to find out what were her mother's last words. Isaac proves he is real, telling Meg details of the day her mother died, then whispers in Meg's ear her mother's last words (without letting the audience know). When Darren asks her about her visit, she claims that Isaac was a fraud. Before they leave, Meg meets Evie (Jasmin Savoy Brown), who reaffirms that no one in Miracle finds what they are looking for.

=== Present day ===
Meg is called out by GR members for her methods, one of which involved trapping children in a school bus with a fake grenade. Meg berates the GR leadership for their beliefs, asserting that violence is necessary to make people "remember". She denies that she has been buying plastic explosive and is told to handle the problem with Tom (Chris Zylka), who has been pulling people away from GR by hugging their pain away. Meg visits a local support group where Tom hugs her. That night, Tom confronts Laurie (Amy Brenneman) over her "pimping" him for the hugs, causing her to slap him. Angry, he abandons her.

Tom meets Meg at a GR charter, revealing he wants to join. When he mentions that his family moved to Miracle, Meg laughs with a new idea. As she drives them, Tom asks why she raped him, but she decides to stop at a bar. While dancing, she states that she wanted him to get her pregnant. The next day, they reach a GR base near Miracle, where a man stumbled upon the property. Even though the man claims to not have seen anything, Meg orders the man be stoned to death. Meg visits the refugee camp outside Miracle, where Matt (Christopher Eccleston) recognizes her. Meg states she is just visiting the place, which does not convince Matt. At the GR base, Tom inspects a nearby barn, which contains a home trailer with the doors locked. He opens the door with an axe, finding Evie and her missing friends, revealed to now be members of the GR. Tom asks who Evie is, to which she writes "It doesn't matter" and closes the door.

== Production ==
=== Development ===
In November 2015, the episode's title was revealed as "Ten Thirteen" and it was announced that series creator Damon Lindelof and supervising producer Monica Beletsky had written the episode while Keith Gordon had directed it. This was Lindelof's eighteenth writing credit, Beletsky's first writing credit, and Gordon's second directing credit.

== Reception ==
=== Viewers ===
The episode was watched by 0.861 million viewers, earning a 0.4 in the 18-49 rating demographics on the Nielson ratings scale. This means that 0.4 percent of all households with televisions watched the episode. This was a 23% increase from the previous episode, which was watched by 0.696 million viewers with a 0.3 in the 18-49 demographics.

=== Critical reviews ===
"Ten Thirteen" received critical acclaim. The review aggregator website Rotten Tomatoes reported a 92% approval rating with an average rating of 8.8/10 for the episode, based on 12 reviews. The site's consensus states: "Liv Tyler delivers a quietly menacing performance in 'Ten Thirteen', as The Leftovers pivots in yet another direction during season two."

Matt Fowler of IGN gave the episode an "amazing" 9 out of 10 and wrote in his verdict, "With help from Olivia Newton-John's 'Magic', and some snippets from Grandmaster Flash's 'White Lines', The Leftovers once again excellent steered us in a new direction. One though that worked to connect everything everything we'd seen so far. And the GR had taken enough of a back seat this year that I was totally fine with them returning to once again play the 'big bad' here. With another dangerous stunt designed to inflict misery."

Joshua Alston of The A.V. Club gave the episode an "A" grade and wrote, "The Leftovers is magical. Not only in the sense that it flirts with magical realism and whimsical ideas, but also in the sense that its narrative sleight-of-hand tricks are unparalleled. It's television as close-up magic. You can look and look, and still not see what's happening right before your eyes. 'Ten Thirteen' ends with what has to be the most brutal gut punch a television show has pulled off all year."

Alan Sepinwall of HitFix wrote, "Still, even with the memory of her last encounter with Tommy relatively fresh in my mind, I wasn't prepared for the full and monstrous fury of Meg that was unleashed in this episode." Jeff Labrecque of Entertainment Weekly wrote, "'Ten Thirteen', the penultimate episode of season 2, was a master stroke of storytelling jiu-jitsu — specifically because it followed 'International Assassin.'"

Kelly Braffet of Vulture gave the episode a 3 star rating out of 5 and wrote, "All of my criticism aside, Liv Tyler's performance this week is stellar. Meg is deeply, decidedly scary, and her emotional hairpin turns are perfect." Nick Harley of Den of Geek gave the episode a 4 star rating out of 5 and wrote, "Just like the inclusion of 'White Lines' in this hour, The Leftovers has been brilliant all year, and I can't wait to see how they end this spectacular run."

Robert Ham of Paste gave the episode a 9.3 out of 10 wrote, "That knot of tension that you're feeling in your stomach after watching this week's episode of The Leftovers? That's not going anywhere for at least another seven days. It may linger for even longer than that, seeing as it has been building and growing more taut for the past nine weeks now — all to gear us up for what's going to be a momentous series-ending episode." Jen Chaney of The New York Times wrote, "Meg is the last person you'd expect to go rogue-terrorist, which is what makes her so scary; if she can turn this unrepentant, anyone can."
