= Orange Sticker =

- The Leftovers episode
- Episode no.: Season 2 Episode 4
- Directed by: Tom Shankland
- Written by: Damon Lindelof; Tom Spezialy
- Cinematography by: Todd McMullen
- Editing by: Michael Ruscio
- Production code: 4X6054
- Original air date: October 25, 2015
- Running time: 55 minutes

Guest appearances
- Darius McCrary as Isaac Rayney; Steven Williams as Virgil

Episode chronology
← Previous "Off Ramp"	Next → "No Room at the Inn"

"Orange Sticker" is the fourth episode of the second season of the American supernatural drama television series The Leftovers, based on the novel of the same name by Tom Perrotta. It is the fourteenth overall episode of the series and was written by series creator Damon Lindelof and executive producer Tom Spezialy, and directed by Tom Shankland. It was first broadcast on HBO in the United States on October 25, 2015.

In the episode, Kevin tries to evade suspicion from his appearance in the lake, where the girls disappeared. Meanwhile, Nora starts to question if Miracle is truly as special as it was believed.

According to Nielsen Media Research, the episode was seen by an estimated 0.519 million household viewers and gained a 0.3 ratings share among adults aged 18–49. The episode received extremely positive reviews from critics, who praised the return to the Jarden scenes, character development, performances (particularly Carrie Coon) and pacing.

== Plot ==
As the earthquake hits Jarden in the night, Nora (Carrie Coon) takes Lily downstairs and awakens Jill (Margaret Qualley) to alert her. Nora is alarmed when Kevin (Justin Theroux) is nowhere to be found, and sees John (Kevin Carroll) and Michael (Jovan Adepo) hurriedly leaving in their car. When Erika (Regina King) says that Evie disappeared, Nora believes a second Departure happened and faints. The next morning, she is relieved when she sees Kevin again.

Questioned by Nora and Jill, Kevin says he woke up in the lake with no memory of how he got there. They advise him not to tell anything, as Evie and her friends disappeared in that area during the night. Kevin helps the local search party in the lake, as he needs to retrieve his phone from the scene. To complicate matters, Kevin's palm print is on the girls' car from when he touched it the night before. That night, after the search party has left, Kevin finds his phone with the help of Patti (Ann Dowd). However, he is picked up by John, who takes him to the outskirts of Miracle. John wants to confront Isaac, deducing that he is responsible for their disappearance.

At a motel, John confronts Isaac but is shot in the stomach when he prepares to attack him with a baseball bat. Instead of taking him to a hospital, Kevin complies with his wish that Erika treat him. As Erika treats his wound, she confides in Kevin that the Departure changed John, who was pacifist, and still believes in the idea that Miracle is special, deeming Evie's birth as a miracle. The next day, Nora visits Matt (Christopher Eccleston), questioning if the town is truly special. Matt reveals that Mary (Janel Moloney) woke up on their first day of arrival, before returning to her catatonic state the next day, which just made him believe again. Meanwhile, Jill spends some time with Michael, who fixes the kitchen sink that got ruined during the earthquake. He also reveals that the "verified" orange stickers on the houses in town were used to identify houses where people did not vanish, which was all the houses in Miracle.

As he walks home, Kevin is once again confronted by Patti, who claims he does not love his family. Kevin finally answers back, telling that he loves his family. Patti then reveals that Kevin tried to kill himself that night, which shocks him. Patti also states that the disappearance of the girls was the result of a second departure event. At home, Nora tells Kevin that she believes he is innocent in Evie's disappearance, but she does not want to feel the anxiety and terror again of waking alone. She wants to handcuff herself to him while they sleep, which he accepts to do. When she asks him if he believes the girls will be found, Kevin says he does not think so. The episode ends as Jill stares out of her window, where she sees Michael removing the "verified" orange sticker from his house.

== Production ==
=== Development ===
In September 2015, the episode's title was revealed as "Orange Sticker" and it was announced that series creator Damon Lindelof and executive producer Tom Spezialy had written the episode while Tom Shankland had directed it. This was Lindelof's thirteenth writing credit, Spezialy's first writing credit, and Shankland's first directing credit.

== Reception ==
=== Viewers ===
The episode was watched by 0.519 million viewers, earning a 0.3 in the 18-49 rating demographics on the Nielson ratings scale. This means that 0.3 percent of all households with televisions watched the episode. This was a 34% decrease from the previous episode, which was watched by 0.777 million viewers with a 0.4 in the 18-49 demographics.

=== Critical reviews ===
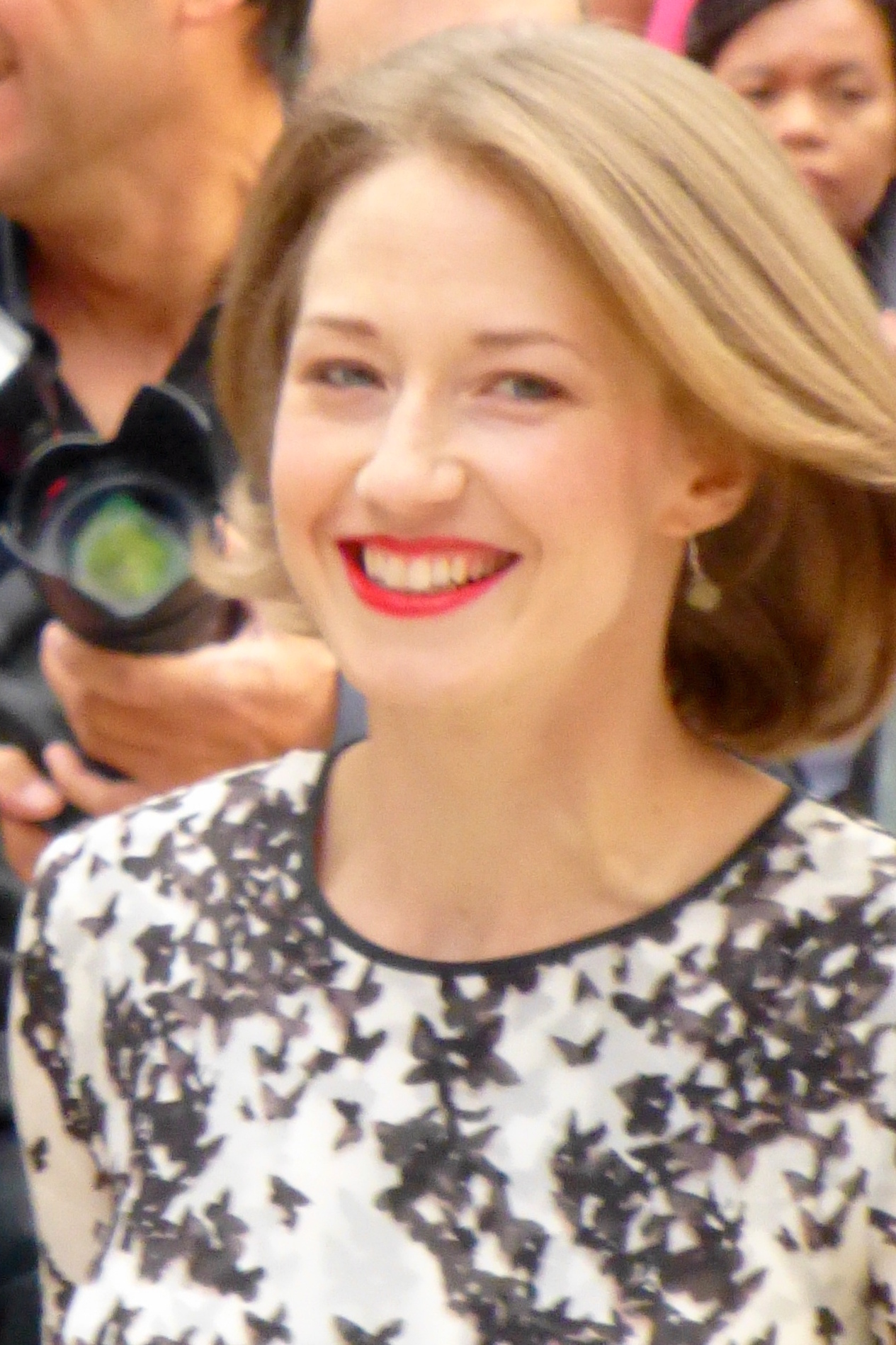
Carrie Coon received acclaim for her performance in the episode.

"Orange Sticker" received extremely positive reviews from critics. The review aggregator website Rotten Tomatoes reported a 100% approval rating with an average rating of 8.67/10 for the episode, based on 10 reviews.

Matt Fowler of IGN gave the episode a "great" 8.8 out of 10 and wrote in his verdict, "The Leftovers delivered a powerful, revealing episode as we headed back to Miracle for the aftermath of what might turn out to be the town's first-ever Departure event."

Joshua Alston of The A.V. Club gave the episode an "A–" grade and wrote, "I went into 'Orange Sticker' slightly bummed about having to wait indefinitely for an update on Tommy and his healing hugs. You know a show is slaying everything when your biggest complaint is not getting to spend enough time with the characters. Still, 'Orange Sticker' continues The Leftovers' season two winning streak with a triumphant return to Miracle, a town watching helplessly as its privileged status begins to slip away."

Alan Sepinwall of HitFix wrote, "This isn't a bad episode, but it's a letdown after the intensity and tightness of the first three. Maybe this show just has trouble with fourth episodes?" Jeff Labrecque of Entertainment Weekly wrote, "'Wherever you go, there you are.' That's what Damon Lindelof told EW in his season 2 preview. And that's what Jill tells Nora after Kevin's recent sleepwalking jaunt coincides with an earthquake."

Kelly Braffet of Vulture gave the episode a 4 star rating out of 5 and wrote, "This season, for the first time, we're starting to deal with the larger questions: Was there a celestial Hand at work in the Departure? Is there a Plan?" Nick Harley of Den of Geek gave the episode a 4 star rating out of 5 and wrote, "This episode promises that 'everything is going to change now', and I can't wait to see the tow of Miracle unravel now that it may not be miraculous after all. Besides all that I've mentioned above, I'm really curious to see how the mysterious Virgil will fit into the stories proceedings, or what exactly is the importance of the water, which has been focused on multiple times. Instead of create theories, I'll just say that those are two things that I'll be keeping my eye on, you know, 'let the mystery be.'"

Robert Ham of Paste gave the episode a 9.6 out of 10 wrote, "Even if this hour left us with many more questions than it started with (and there were already a lot of puzzles looking to be solved), this was as strong as the show has ever been." Jen Chaney of The New York Times wrote, "The Leftovers excels, as usual, at creating a heavy mood of surreal melancholy. Compared to the first three episodes, though, this one contains a bit more on-the-nose dialogue."

=== Accolades ===
TVLine named Carrie Coon as the "Performer of the Week" for the week of October 31, 2015, for her performance in the episode. The site wrote, "One of the (many, many) marvels of Coon's work on The Leftovers is how believably she's able to play Nora as alternately someone who seems to have her s— together and someone who's never further than a single nightmare away from a complete and total nervous breakdown. So in Sunday's episode, which allowed the actress to highlight both sides of that dichotomy, she was every bit as brilliant as you'd expect... and then some."
