= Off Ramp (The Leftovers) =

- The Leftovers episode
- Episode no.: Season 2 Episode 3
- Directed by: Carl Franklin
- Written by: Damon Lindelof; Patrick Somerville
- Cinematography by: John Grillo
- Editing by: David Eisenberg
- Production code: 4X6053
- Original air date: October 18, 2015
- Running time: 56 minutes

Guest appearances
- Paterson Joseph as Holy Wayne; Heather Kafka as Susan; Mark Harelik as Peter; Alon Moni Aboutboul as Viktor

Episode chronology
← Previous "A Matter of Geography"	Next → "Orange Sticker"

"Off Ramp" is the third episode of the second season of the American supernatural drama television series The Leftovers, based on the novel of the same name by Tom Perrotta. It is the thirteenth overall episode of the series and was written by series creator Damon Lindelof and co-producer Patrick Somerville, and directed by Carl Franklin. It was first broadcast on HBO in the United States on October 18, 2015.

In the episode, Laurie and Tom are setting a support group of former GR members, hoping to get them to return to their normal lives.

According to Nielsen Media Research, the episode was seen by an estimated 0.777 million household viewers and gained a 0.4 ratings share among adults aged 18–49. The episode received critical acclaim, with critics praising Brenneman's and Zylka's performances, character development, directing, score and themes.

== Plot ==
Tom (Chris Zylka) contacts an ex-member of the Guilty Remnant, Susan (Heather Kafka), taking her to a building where Laurie (Amy Brenneman) has formed a support group for former members, returning to her previous job as psychiatrist. Tom is looking for a new GR charter in the area, where he wants to identify the most disillusioned members and get them to the support group.

As Tom infiltrates a charter, Laurie writes a book, which will expose all of the activities that the GR was involved in. Knowing that Tom will meet with Jill (Margaret Qualley), she asks him to deliver a letter to her. Her office is blocked by the landlord, as Laurie has not paid to lease it, which prevents her from taking her laptop with her manuscript. She sneaks at his home at night, where she takes back her laptop. She manages to flee from the landlord's wife, until she finds the road has been blocked by two GR members. After revving her engine, she hits them with her car. With her laptop, she sends the manuscript to her publisher.

Tom attempts to infiltrate another charter, only to be caught instead. Tied in a van, he is visited by Meg (Liv Tyler). She rapes him and then has other members throw him to the ground and douse him with gasoline. She pulls out a lighter but spares him, telling him to tell Laurie. He returns home, where he confronts Laurie about Meg and her methods, without telling her about the rape. Later, Laurie is heartbroken to discover that Susan killed herself along with her husband and child after reading a note from the GR. While meeting with the publisher, Peter (Mark Harelik), Laurie is taken aback when they want to make edit changes to her book, causing her to attack Peter.

Laurie is bailed out of jail by Tom, who takes her home. He comforts her on Susan's death, telling her that the GR gives its members something and that to counter that the support group needs to be given something different to take its place. At their next support group meeting, Laurie opens up about how joining GR ruined her relationship with Jill. Tom then speaks with a story regarding Holy Wayne. He claims that before his death, Wayne wanted Tom to keep his powers to take their pain away. Tom then offers the group a hug.

== Production ==
=== Development ===
In September 2015, the episode's title was revealed as "Off Ramp" and it was announced that series creator Damon Lindelof and co-producer Patrick Somerville had written the episode while Carl Franklin had directed it. This was Lindelof's twelfth writing credit, Somerville's first writing credit, and Franklin's third directing credit.

=== Writing ===
The episode featured a scene where Meg rapes Tom in a van. Damon Lindelof explained, "when you are depicting it on television, any presentation of non-consensual sex, you just have to do it with a lot of intentionality and a lot of responsibility and hopefully we did. But, you know, we didn't go into it with blinders on."

== Reception ==
=== Viewers ===
The episode was watched by 0.777 million viewers, earning a 0.4 in the 18-49 rating demographics on the Nielson ratings scale. This means that 0.4 percent of all households with televisions watched the episode. This was a 40% increase from the previous episode, which was watched by 0.552 million viewers with a 0.3 in the 18-49 demographics.

=== Critical reviews ===
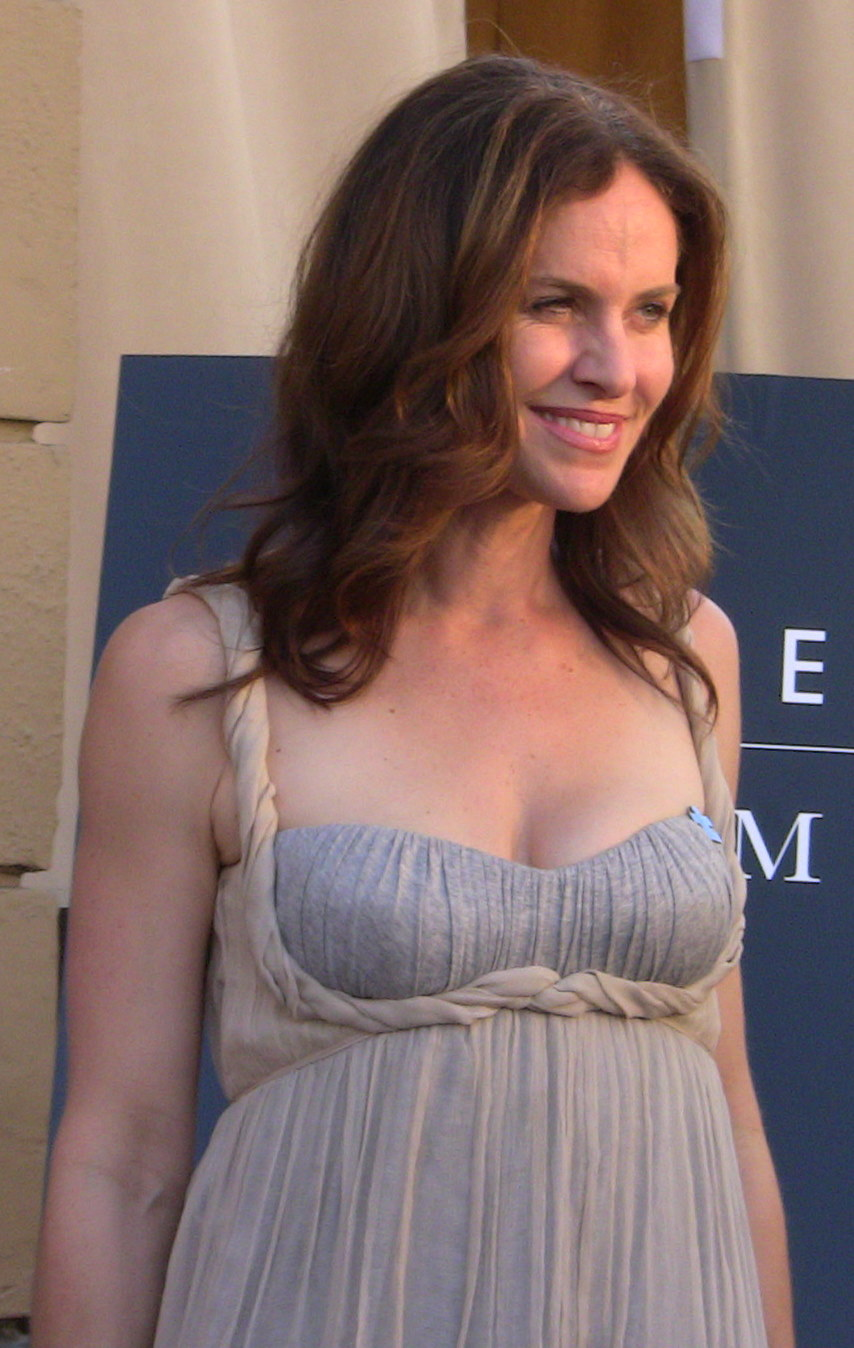
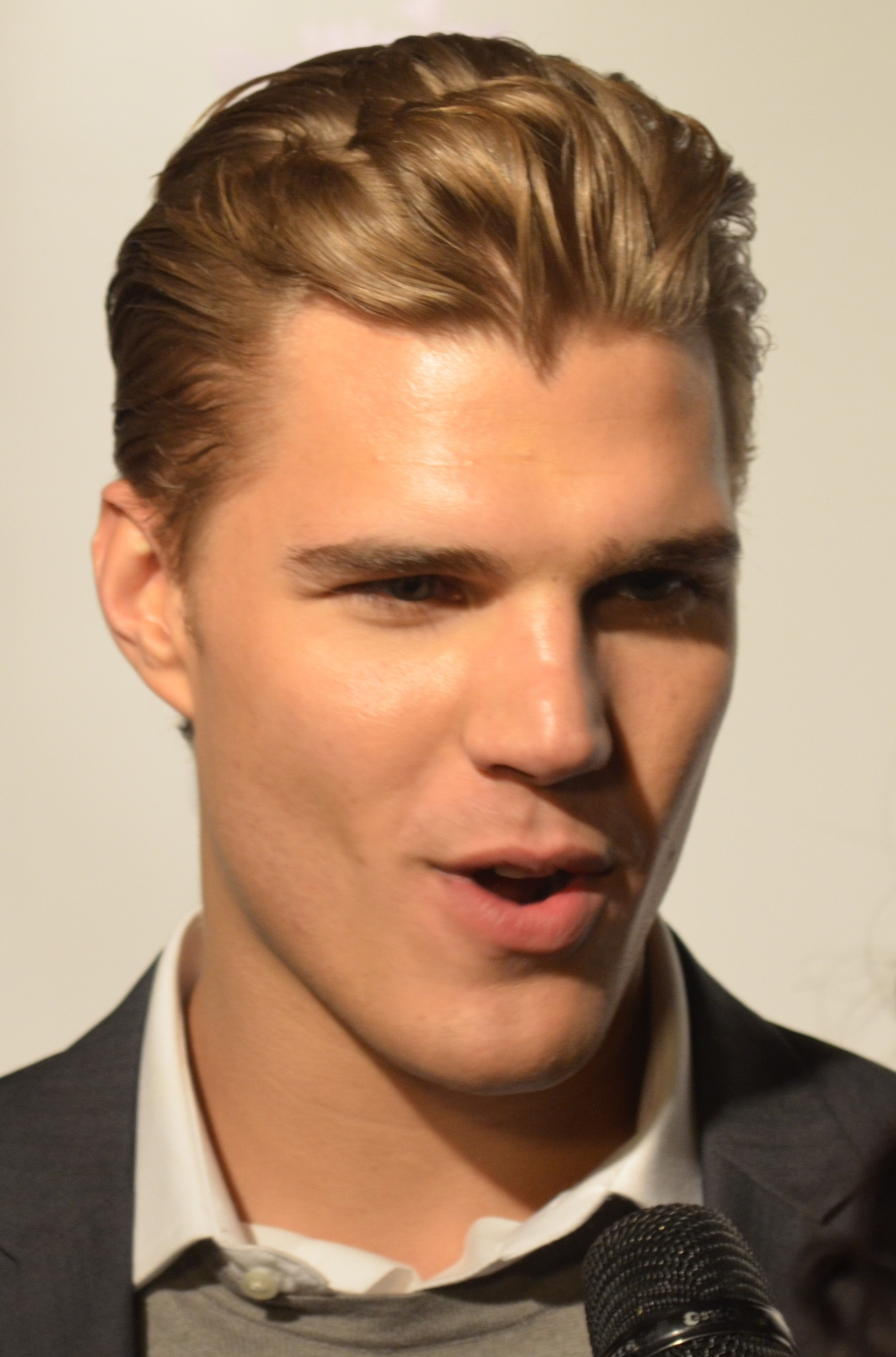
The performances of Amy Brenneman and Chris Zylka in the episode garnered critical acclaim.

"Off Ramp" received critical acclaim. The review aggregator website Rotten Tomatoes reported a 100% approval rating with an average rating of 9.15/10 for the episode, based on 14 reviews. The site's consensus states: "'Off Ramp' is an especially provocative and haunting episode of The Leftovers, thanks to a stirring performance by Amy Brenneman."

Matt Fowler of IGN gave the episode an "amazing" 9.5 out of 10 and wrote in his verdict, "'Off Ramp' was exceptional, taking us back into the sad, soul-sapping arms of the Guilty Remnant and all the irrevocably damaged people who find solace within its ranks (or whatever depressing term you'd use for that particular brand of 'giving up on life'). Haunting, moving, and thought-provoking."

Joshua Alston of The A.V. Club gave the episode an "A" grade and wrote, "Though the more hopeful tone in the first two episodes, achieved through the Texas relocation, is nowhere to be found in 'Off Ramp', it still manages to be the most solidly crafted and emotionally affecting episode in an already confident season. The Leftovers isn't just adding new stories, it's finding shrewd ways to tell the old ones."

Alan Sepinwall of HitFix wrote, "The Jarden episodes haven't exactly been sunshine and rainbows but at least there, there's some sense of hope and mystery. This was The Leftovers reverting back to season 1 not just in location, but in tone. Which, since I loved the first season, is damn fine by me. This was as great a showcase for Amy Brenneman as 'Guest' was last year for Carrie Coon." Jeff Labrecque of Entertainment Weekly wrote, "The gravitational pull of the GR and their logic has a hold that is hard to shake. Just ask Tom."

Kelly Braffet of Vulture gave the episode a 4 star rating out of 5 and wrote, "The writing is great and the acting is phenomenal; Amy Brenneman in particular really gets to shine, in a chaotic, depressing way." Nick Harley of Den of Geek gave the episode a 4 star rating out of 5 and wrote, "In my eyes, The Leftovers has set up three completely different, unique sets of characters with plenty of fertile storytelling ground ahead for all of them. I couldn't be happier with the way the season has started and I look forward to see how the split Garvey clan will mirror each other as we move into uncharted waters."

Robert Ham of Paste gave the episode a 9.6 out of 10 wrote, "They certainly landed a healthy emotional blow this week." Jen Chaney of The New York Times wrote, "It is an elegantly directed, heartbreaking hour that showcases an emotionally nuanced performance from Amy Brenneman and, once again, illustrates the uphill climb involved in making fresh starts."

=== Accolades ===
TVLine named Chris Zylka as an honorable mention as the "Performer of the Week" for the week of October 24, 2015, for his performance in the episode. The site wrote, "We'd been impressed by Chris Zylka's understated work on The Leftovers before. But in 'Off Ramp', he took it to a whole other level. After Tom realized that he and mom Laurie were never going to be able to save the members of the Guilty Remnant unless they offered something as attractive as the white-clad chain smokers did, he told their support group for former cultists that he'd been bequeathed Holy Wayne's power of healing touch. Actually, Tom didn't so much tell them as he sold them on the idea. To get them to buy it, he had to be brave, ballsy, maybe even a little bit nuts — and what are the odds? Those are all descriptors that we'd also affix to his portrayer's go-for-broke performance."
