= Crazy Whitefella Thinking =

- The Leftovers episode
- Episode no.: Season 3 Episode 3
- Directed by: Mimi Leder
- Written by: Damon Lindelof; Tom Spezialy
- Cinematography by: John Grillo
- Editing by: Michael Ruscio
- Production code: T13.19803
- Original air date: April 30, 2017
- Running time: 58 minutes

Guest appearances
- Lindsay Duncan as Grace Playford; David Gulpilil as Christopher Sunday; Damien Garvey as Kevin Yarborough; Lasarus Ratuere as Officer Bardo

Episode chronology
| ← Previous "Don't Be Ridiculous" | Next → "G'Day Melbourne" |

"Crazy Whitefella Thinking" is the third episode of the third season of the American supernatural drama television series The Leftovers, based on the novel of the same name by Tom Perrotta. It is the 23rd overall episode of the series and was written by series creator Damon Lindelof and executive producer Tom Spezialy, and directed by executive producer Mimi Leder. It was first broadcast on HBO in the United States on April 30, 2017.

In the episode, Kevin Sr.'s actions in Australia are revealed, believing that a flood is coming to end the world.

According to Nielsen Media Research, the episode was seen by an estimated 0.846 million household viewers and gained a 0.4 ratings share among adults aged 18–49. The episode received extremely positive reviews from critics, who praised Scott Glenn's performance, character development, cinematography and themes.

== Plot ==
In the Outback, Kevin Sr. (Scott Glenn) dances by a bonfire to a self-made recording of a songline until local authorities (Lasarus Ratuere) arrest him, with Kevin Sr. claiming that he was singing to prevent the Apocalypse. After being released, he drives to a stop, where he tries to find the location of a tribal leader named Christopher Sunday (David Gulpilil), as Sunday knows a specific chant that Kevin Sr. claims will finish his songline.

Kevin Sr. calls Matt (Christopher Eccleston), who had sent him an early copy of the gospel of Kevin. Kevin Sr. is furious that Matt omitted him from the gospel, also warning him not to let Kevin Jr. anywhere near Australia. After stealing Sunday's address from an official, Kevin Sr. finally finds Sunday at his home. Kevin Sr. explains that the voices inside his head instructed him to go to Australia, where a drug trip caused to meet a chicken, who warned him that the apocalypse was coming through a flood on the seventh anniversary of the Departure. Kevin Sr. claims that he needs to learn songs from native tribes to prevent the flood, and Sunday is the only person who knows the last song. Sunday claims his song can only "cause" rain, not "stop" it. Nevertheless, he offers to teach Kevin Sr. if he will fix a leak on Sunday's roof. However, the official from whom Kevin stole Sunday's address arrives at the house, Kevin Sr. slips and falls off the roof, and he lands on Sunday, seriously injuring him.

Taken by an ambulance, Kevin Sr.'s behavior annoys the paramedics, who leave him alone in the Outback. As he wanders through the wilderness, he tries and fails to persuade a man from killing himself, with the man claiming "they didn't take me." During the night a storm destroys Kevin's tapes, saddening him. With no food, he is forced to fight a snake to eat it, but is bitten instead. A weakened Kevin Sr. collapses in front of a cross. Kevin Sr. wakes up in the home of a woman named Grace Playford (Lindsay Duncan), who had treated his wounds. He calls Matt and discovers it has been three weeks since he was bitten, asks for Matt's help in finding Sunday's status, but Matt angrily hangs up when Kevin Sr. reveals he threw away the gospel that Matt had sent. Kevin Sr. goes outside and discovers locals building a boat for the coming flood, and also learns that Sunday has died from his injuries. Kevin Sr. goes back inside, falls alseep, and is awakened in the night as Grace and a group of women drown a police officer. When confronting the women Kevin Sr. is shot with a tranquilizer dart and falls back asleep.

The next morning, Grace explains that the police officer was named Kevin, and that she had killed him. She reveals that her husband vanished during the Departure while she was out grocery shopping, and she assumed her five children had as well when they weren't present. Two years after the Departure her children's bones were discovered, as they had set out across the Outback without either parent present and had died in the elements. The cross on which Kevin Sr. collapsed was the place where her children's bones had been discovered. When Grace found Kevin Sr. he had a page from The Book of Kevin clutched in his hand. She took this as a sign from God and led her to drown the Australian police officer named Kevin, attempting to prove both his legitimacy and her religious devotion, so that she could contact her children one last time. She laments that her belief is incorrect. Kevin Sr. consoles her, telling her she just got the wrong Kevin.

== Production ==
=== Development ===
In March 2017, the episode's title was revealed as "Crazy Whitefella Thinking" and it was announced that series creator Damon Lindelof and executive producer Tom Spezialy had written the episode while executive producer Mimi Leder had directed it. This was Lindelof's 22nd writing credit, Spezialy's second writing credit, and Leder's ninth directing credit.

== Reception ==
=== Viewers ===
The episode was watched by 0.846 million viewers, earning a 0.4 in the 18-49 rating demographics on the Nielson ratings scale. This means that 0.4 percent of all households with televisions watched the episode. This was a 9% increase from the previous episode, which was watched by 0.776 million viewers with a 0.3 in the 18-49 demographics.

=== Critical reviews ===
"Crazy Whitefella Thinking" received extremely positive reviews from critics. The review aggregator website Rotten Tomatoes reported a 100% approval rating with an average rating of 8.6/10 for the episode, based on 17 reviews. The site's consensus states: "Riddled with beautiful shots of the Australian Outback, 'Crazy Whitefella Thinking' spotlights the integral arc of an important side character."

Matt Fowler of IGN gave the episode a "great" 8.6 out of 10 and wrote in his verdict, "The Leftovers continued its sublime streak of taking things seriously-but-not-too-seriously as we followed Kevin Garvey, Sr.'s desperate vision quest down in Australia. The fact that he's a hero/fool mix, like Don Quixote, works even better because of the dramatic irony at play. We know, for the most part, that he's probably right. Not about every aspect of his erratic journey, but in so far as the voices go. Because we've gone on enough Kevin Jr. ride-alongs to know the truth. A stirring and fun (connected) detour."

Joshua Alston of The A.V. Club gave the episode a "B+" grade and wrote, "'Whitefella' is definitely paced slower than the first two episodes of the season and it's entirely set around 9,000 miles from the main action of the story. The Leftovers often asks the audience to sacrifice superficial check-ins with every character in favor of spending quality time with one or two. It's a terrific approach when the focus is on Kevin, Nora, Laurie, Matt, or even Meg. Kevin Sr. is a tougher sell because of how tangential he was to the middle section of this three-season series. He was a huge presence, but was totally absent. To spend this much time with him in Australia doesn't always make for the most riveting television."

Alan Sepinwall of Uproxx wrote, "For an episode littered with gorgeous shots of the Australian Outback, 'Crazy Whitefella Thinking' is at its most stunning during a pair of monologues delivered indoors and shot by Mimi Leder mostly in tight closeup." Jeff Labrecque of Entertainment Weekly wrote, "In Chief's head, as he makes clear early in the episode, this entire adventure is his story. Perhaps other characters will get their own gospels in the final five episodes, adding pages to Matt’s new New Testament."

Sean T. Collins of Vulture gave the episode a 3 star rating out of 5 and wrote, "The Leftovers does not shy away from spelling out just how crazy these people can get." Nick Harley of Den of Geek gave the episode a perfect 5 star rating out of 5 and wrote, "The Leftovers has been beyond brilliant so far in its final season and I am already mourning the loss of this wonderfully rewarding show. With each episode more stunning than the last, I can only imagine what else Damon Lindelof and HBO have in store for us. Kevin and Nora will arrive in Australia next week, though Kevin Sr. said that he doesn't want Kevin 'anywhere near Australia'. Things are already interesting; next week, it looks like things will finally start getting climactic."

Matt Brennan of Paste gave the episode an 8.7 out of 10 wrote, "The Leftovers is uninterested in answers; its humane treatment of people bearing the unbearable resides, after all, in the drama of questions, the terror of ignorance, the needle of doubt." Noel Murray of The New York Times wrote, "As episode’s the title implies, 'Crazy Whitefella Thinking' is in part about the arrogance of an outsider who embraces his messianic delusions at the expense of other people’s feelings and property."

=== Accolades ===
TVLine named Scott Glenn as the "Performer of the Week" for the week of May 6, 2017, for his performance in the episode. The site wrote, "All the way back in December of 2015, Leftovers executive producer Damon Lindelof was looking forward to using Glenn in the HBO drama’s third and final season less like 'a relieving pitcher' than 'a starting pitcher.' And with last Sunday's episode, it was made abundantly clear why: When the veteran actor was at last given a turn on the mound, he confidently threw a no-hitter."
