= Lens (The Leftovers) =

- The Leftovers episode
- Episode no.: Season 2 Episode 6
- Directed by: Craig Zobel
- Written by: Damon Lindelof; Tom Perrotta
- Cinematography by: Michael Grady
- Editing by: Michael Ruscio
- Production code: 4X6056
- Original air date: November 8, 2015
- Running time: 57 minutes

Guest appearances
- Jasmin Savoy Brown as Evie Murphy; Steven Williams as Virgil; Dominic Burgess as Dr. Brian Goodheart; Joel Murray as George Brevity; Sonya Walger as Dr. Allison Herbert

Episode chronology
← Previous "No Room at the Inn"	Next → "A Most Powerful Adversary"

"Lens" is the sixth episode of the second season of the American supernatural drama television series The Leftovers, based on the novel of the same name by Tom Perrotta. It is the sixteenth overall episode of the series and was written by series creators Damon Lindelof and Tom Perrotta, and directed by Craig Zobel. It was first broadcast on HBO in the United States on November 8, 2015.

In the episode, Nora is introduced to a scientific theory where she is deemed a "lens", which could link her to the departure of her family. Meanwhile, the Murphys organize a fundraiser for the missing girls, although Erika loses her temper.

According to Nielsen Media Research, the episode was seen by an estimated 0.636 million household viewers and gained a 0.3 ratings share among adults aged 18–49. The episode received critical acclaim, with critics praising the performances, writing, character development, emotional tone and pacing. The scene where Nora and Erika have a conversation at the end of the episode received universal acclaim and was deemed the highlight of the episode.

== Plot ==
A scientist named Joaquin Cuarto (Diego Wallraff) arrives at Miracle. He visits Nora (Carrie Coon) to question her about her role in her husband's and children's disappearance, as well as the fact that Evie and her friends disappeared on the night she arrived at Miracle. Nora refuses to answer his questions and demands that he leave the property. That night, she throws a rock at the Murphy house's window, breaking it.

The next day a man who works for the DSD, George Brevity (Joel Murray), visits Nora. They agree to meeting at a restaurant. George explains that a new "lens theory" has been suggested by the DSD; a "lens" is deemed as someone who lost a certain number of people when the Departure happened by being in close proximity, and could be considered a point of origin if it were to happen again. Later, Nora is called by another scientist, claiming that she could be a lens that was chosen by Azrael, both amusing and disturbing her. Erika (Regina King) brings Lily back to Nora, who Kevin accidentally left on the hood of their parked truck. Nora notices Kevin (Justin Theroux) speaking by himself, unaware that he is seeing Patti (Ann Dowd).

Erika confronts a boy leaving a pie on her doorstep. She visits the sender of the pie, who she discovers is her father Virgil (Steven Williams), and tells him she is not interested in reconciliation. She also confronts Michael (Jovan Adepo) for visiting him to pray. Michael reaffirms that Virgil deserves to be forgiven and also reveals that John previously shot Virgil. While Nora visits Matt (Christopher Eccleston) at the refugee camp, he expresses disapproval that she intends to take Mary (Janel Moloney) to the Murphys' fundraiser for Evie, given that John (Kevin Carroll) doubted their story of her pregnancy. Nora is also called by Laurie (Amy Brenneman), who has lost track of Tom, asking her to give him an apology on her behalf if she sees him.

During the fundraiser, Nora steals the new DSD questionnaire from George Brevity. Then Erika confronts a man for planning to slaughter a goat during the presentation. The man killed a goat on October 14 and avoided charges because the town believed he saved them during the Departure. She calls him and other residents out, telling them that Miracle is not special and that the girls, in fact, departed. Nora decides to visit Erika later at home, where she invites her to answer the DSD interview questions in an effort to prove the missing girls did not depart.

While answering, Erika opens up about her family. She confesses that she was planning on leaving John. She also explains how her grandmother indicated to her that she could make a wish by keeping a sparrow on a box buried in the ground, wait three days, and make a wish if the sparrow was alive. Erika states she did it, opening a box with a live sparrow, and wishing that her kids would be alright without her. As Evie disappeared the next day, Erika blames herself for her disappearance. Nora states it is not her fault, although she is conflicted when Erika makes her remember that she lashed out at her family right before they departed. Nora returns home, where Kevin finally confesses that he is seeing Patti in his mind, explaining why he talks to himself. Suddenly, a rock smashes through their window. As Nora looks outside, Erika makes eye contact before walking away.

== Production ==
=== Development ===
In October 2015, the episode's title was revealed as "Lens" and it was announced that series creators Damon Lindelof and Tom Perrotta had written the episode while Craig Zobel had directed it. This was Lindelof's fifteenth writing credit, Perrotta's fifth writing credit, and Zobel's first directing credit.

== Reception ==
=== Viewers ===
The episode was watched by 0.636 million viewers, earning a 0.3 in the 18-49 rating demographics on the Nielson ratings scale. This means that 0.3 percent of all households with televisions watched the episode. This was a slight increase from the previous episode, which was watched by 0.625 million viewers with a 0.3 in the 18-49 demographics.

=== Critical reviews ===
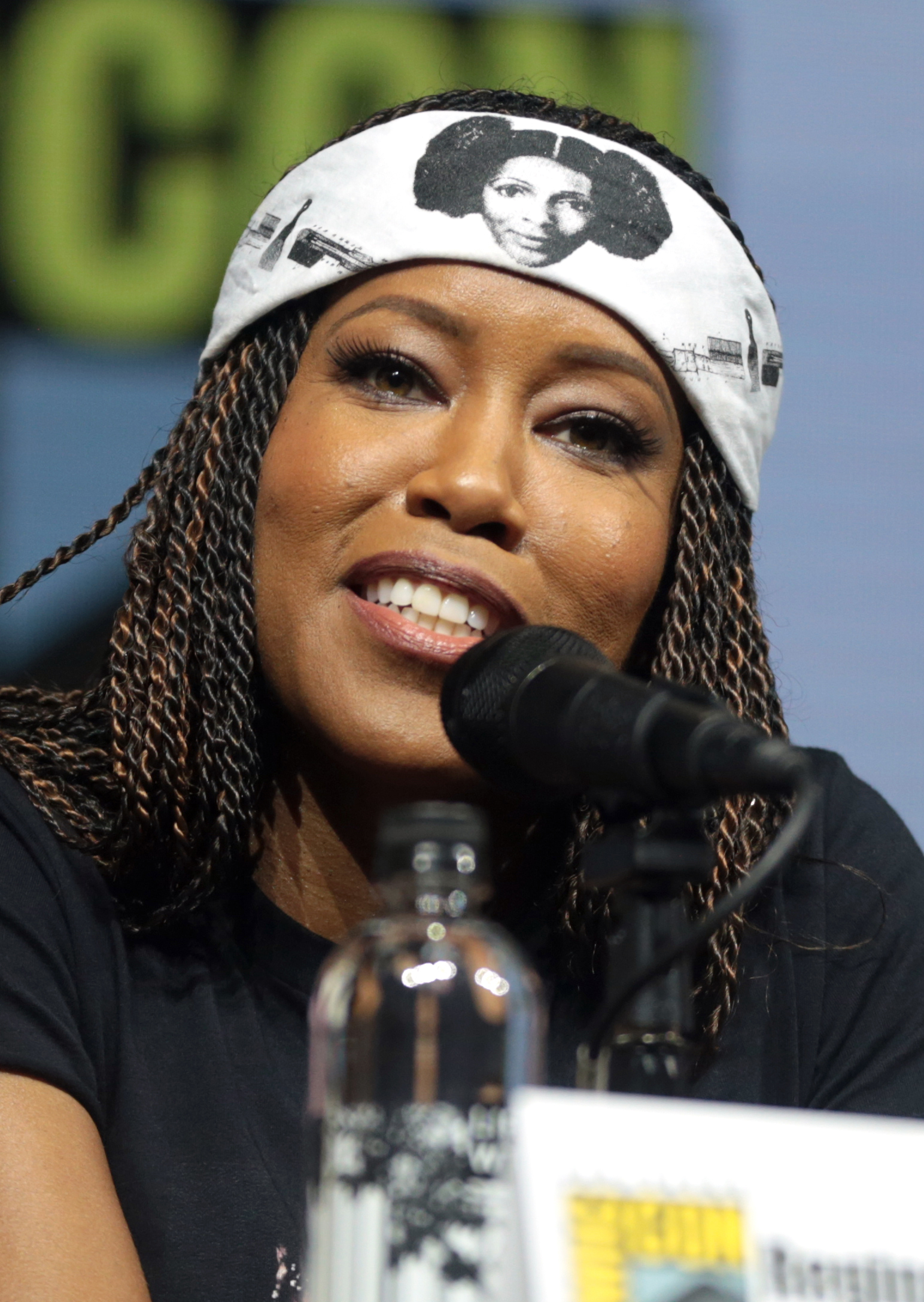
Regina King's performance in the episode received widespread acclaim.

"Lens" received critical acclaim. The review aggregator website Rotten Tomatoes reported a 100% approval rating with an average rating of 9.75/10 for the episode, based on 11 reviews. The site's consensus states: "The Leftovers continues its string of excellent episodes with an especially moving final scene from Regina King and Carrie Coon in 'Lens.'"

Matt Fowler of IGN gave the episode an "amazing" 9 out of 10 and wrote in his verdict, "'Lens' turned the pressure up in Miracle, creating a righteous rift between Nora and Erika over the Evie tragedy. Strong performances and great storytelling have become a Season 2 calling card and this chapter was no exception."

Joshua Alston of The A.V. Club gave the episode an "A" grade and wrote, "After weeks of narrowly focused vignettes, 'Lens' finally braids the show's narrative threads together, and the synergy is even more satisfying than I anticipated. But while there's room for everyone in 'Lens', the focus is on Nora and Erika, and their respective strategies for coping with the uncommon grief of losing a child under such confounding circumstances."

Alan Sepinwall of HitFix wrote, "The episode's power rests on attempts by the hour's two POV characters, Erika and Nora, to figure out how much they're to blame for their loved ones' Departures. And while they'll never get a concrete explanation, they've both obviously come to the conclusion that this is all their fault." Jeff Labrecque of Entertainment Weekly wrote, "People in glass houses shouldn't throw rocks. That is one of the themes in 'Lens', the first episode since episode 2, 'A Matter of Geography', co-scripted by author Tom Perrotta, who's clearly invested in Nora's story in season 2."

Kelly Braffet of Vulture gave the episode a perfect 5 star rating out of 5 and wrote, "This might be my favorite episode of this season so far. Nora and Erika are fantastic characters, and Carrie Coon and Regina King play them to the hilt. This world so often seems like everybody in it is shooting in the dark; maybe Nora and Erika are, too, but their hands almost never shake. They're spellbinding to watch." Nick Harley of Den of Geek gave the episode a 4.5 star rating out of 5 and wrote, "Tonight wasn't less heavy or emotional of an episode, but it was certainly more satisfying, as it put some mysteries to bed, brought us more information about the Murphys, and showed just where some of these plots may be headed. Add in some knockout acting from Carrie Coon and the always brilliant Regina King, and we may be looking at the best episode of the season."

Robert Ham of Paste gave the episode a 9.1 out of 10 wrote, "The expectation that things were always going to come to a head between the Garveys and the Murphys was there from the moment the former bought their house in Jarden. While that will inevitably come down to a confrontation between Kevin and John, for tonight it came down to an amazing and tense standoff between their partners." Jen Chaney of The New York Times wrote, "The Leftovers excels at many things, but its greatest strength may be its ability to convey so much narrative information so naturally. This week's episode, 'Lens' — which deftly explains a ton of back story and demystifies previously cryptic details — is a master class in how that's done."

=== Accolades ===
TVLine named Regina King as the "Performer of the Week" for the week of November 14, 2015, for her performance in the episode. The site wrote, "We know we sound like a broken record, going on the way we do about The Leftovers. But if you watch the show, you understand. And if you don't, not only should you, but you oughta get used to our praise, because both the drama and its stars are just. That. Good. Take, for example, King's tour de force this week."
