= A Matter of Geography =

- The Leftovers episode
- Episode no.: Season 2 Episode 2
- Directed by: Mimi Leder
- Written by: Damon Lindelof; Tom Perrotta
- Cinematography by: Michael Grady
- Editing by: Henk Van Eeghen
- Production code: 4X6052
- Original air date: October 11, 2015
- Running time: 56 minutes

Guest appearances
- Scott Glenn as Kevin Garvey Sr.; Steven Williams as Virgil; Jasmin Savoy Brown as Evangeline "Evie" Murphy; Brad Greenquist as Adoption Agent; Charlayne Woodard as Lois Makepeace; Roger Narayan as Bhagat

Episode chronology
← Previous "Axis Mundi"	Next → "Off Ramp"

"A Matter of Geography" is the second episode of the second season of the American supernatural drama television series The Leftovers, based on the novel of the same name by Tom Perrotta. It is the twelfth overall episode of the series and was written by series creators Damon Lindelof and Tom Perrotta, and directed by executive producer Mimi Leder. It was first broadcast on HBO in the United States on October 11, 2015.

In the episode, the events after Nora found Christine's baby in the Garvey house doorstep is depicted.

According to Nielsen Media Research, the episode was seen by an estimated 0.552 million household viewers and gained a 0.3 ratings share among adults aged 18–49. The episode received critical acclaim, with critics praising the performances, writing, character development, structure, pacing and score.

== Plot ==
In Mapleton, Nora (Carrie Coon) discovers Christine's baby at the Garvey house's doorstep, just as Kevin (Justin Theroux) and Jill (Margaret Qualley) arrive. Later, Kevin confesses to Nora and Jill that he kidnapped Patti (Ann Dowd), as well as his involvement in her death. Nora then confesses that she still keeps her gun and that she hires escorts to shoot her with a vest. Despite this, they laugh at their respective secrets.

Two months later, social services grants Kevin and Nora custody of the baby, now named Lily, officially adopting her. Still feeling guilty, Kevin returns to Cairo, New York, where he exhumes Patti's body. He then pulls up in front of a police officer, confessing that he has a corpse. Taken to the police station, he is questioned by ATFEC officer Lois Makepeace (Charlayne Woodard). Finding that he was the Chief of Police before resigning, the officer releases him, indicating that she does not care in investigating her suicide, given her ties to GR. Kevin is now suffering hallucinations where he sees Patti. Returning home, he finds that Kevin Sr. (Scott Glenn) has been released from the mental institution, intending to move to Australia.

At a diner, Jill meets with Tom (Chris Zylka), to inform him of Lily's adoption. Per his suggestion, Jill won't reveal his location nor tell Kevin about his status. Tom then leaves in a car with Laurie (Amy Brenneman), leaving a note from Laurie to Jill, which she rips apart without reading. Nora is contacted by MIT students, who want to buy her house for $3 million. They explain that they have a theory where there were multiple Departures, which was Nora's house. Their theory suggests that Nora could've vanished if she was at the kitchen table with her family, also indicating that a second Departure could happen. Despite being taken aback, she accepts their offer.

Based on his father's plan to "begin again", Kevin decides to relocate his family. They head to Jarden, Texas, where campers are being escorted out by the guard due to lack of access. Due to quarantine concerns, they must leave their dog with the National Park Service for 60 days. To their shock, they discover that their leased house burned down. While Kevin wants to find another rental, Nora uses her $3 million to buy an auctioned house in the area. As they arrive at their new house, Kevin is once haunted by Patti, who demands that he talks to her.

After attending a birthday party with their neighbors, the Murphys, Kevin expresses his dissatisfaction with Nora spending so much money without really knowing the town. Per Jill's suggestion, he apologizes to Nora. That night, Kevin finds himself in the drained lake, with a cinder block tied to his ankle. After untying himself, he makes his way out of the lake, finding the abandoned car. He then hides when he notices a car approaching, with the passengers revealed to be John (Kevin Carroll) and Michael (Jovan Adepo). As they shout for Evie, Kevin sees Patti next to him again.

== Production ==
=== Development ===
In September 2015, the episode's title was revealed as "A Matter of Geography" and it was announced that series creators Damon Lindelof and Tom Perrotta had written the episode while executive producer Mimi Leder had directed it. This was Lindelof's eleventh writing credit, Perrotta's fourth writing credit, and Leder's fifth directing credit.

== Reception ==
=== Viewers ===
The episode was watched by 0.552 million viewers, earning a 0.3 in the 18-49 rating demographics on the Nielson ratings scale. This means that 0.3 percent of all households with televisions watched the episode. This was a 23% decrease from the previous episode, which was watched by 0.713 million viewers with a 0.3 in the 18-49 demographics.

=== Critical reviews ===
"A Matter of Geography" received critical acclaim. The review aggregator website Rotten Tomatoes reported a 100% approval rating with an average rating of 8.7/10 for the episode, based on 13 reviews. The site's consensus states: "'A Matter of Geography' gives season two of The Leftovers better context by re-introducing the Garvey family and deepening the connection to Miracle, Texas."

Matt Fowler of IGN gave the episode an "amazing" 9.2 out of 10 and wrote in his verdict, "'A Matter of Geography' took us back to the end of Season 1 and picked up Kevin and Nora's story. And despite the excellent opening scene in which the two of them confessed their respective madness to one another, Kevin blackout issues, he'd starkly discover, still remain in a big way. Now with the added bonus of Patti being in his ear at all hours of every waking moment. At one point, Kevin even tried to 'blow up his life', as it was put. The question now is: Is Kevin destined to blow up his life regardless? He's committed to making things work now, but he's still so out of control that he might not be able to help it. This was an excellent chapter that, within just two episodes now, worked to tie so much together (reason for moving, Isaac's house fire, Steven Williams' 'knowing' character, etc)."

Joshua Alston of The A.V. Club gave the episode a "B" grade and wrote, "For anyone who liked 'Axis Mundi' just fine but wanted more of the characters with whom they'd already bonded, 'Geography' makes up the difference."

Alan Sepinwall of HitFix wrote, "Though we're back with Kevin and his blackouts and visions, 'A Matter of Geography' manages to have the intensity of last season's best episodes without feeling quite like a wallow in the way those were. Some of that is just the characters moving forward emotionally and geographically, but the series has found ways to still be about grief and madness without being consumed by them, even if Kevin may still be." Jeff Labrecque of Entertainment Weekly wrote, "'A Matter of Geography' turned back the clock two-plus months, right back to the moment when Nora discovered Holy Wayne's baby on the Garveys' porch, and Kevin and Jill and their new pooch came back to a place that almost felt like a home."

Kelly Braffet of Vulture gave the episode a perfect 5 star rating out of 5 and wrote, "I think that's really the takeaway from this episode. Nobody's okay. Should be a fun season." Nick Harley of Den of Geek gave the episode a 4 star rating out of 5 and wrote, "I don't really need the time this week to know that I really liked 'A Matter of Geography'. So far, The Leftovers is making all the right moves and I can't wait to see where we're heading and if Damon Lindelof can sustain this quality."

Robert Ham of Paste gave the episode a 9.4 out of 10 wrote, "We can shake our heads in disbelief at the people on screen flocking to this made-up town, but eventually we'll come to realize how we're all looking for our own version of Miracle, Texas." Jen Chaney of The New York Times wrote, "The second season of The Leftovers may have been characterized initially as a series reboot. But its second episode, 'A Matter of Geography', suggests that thematically it's actually about how difficult it is to truly start over."
