= I Live Here Now =

- The Leftovers episode
- Kevin (Theroux) performing "Homeward Bound" by Simon & Garfunkel
- Episode no.: Season 2 Episode 10
- Directed by: Mimi Leder
- Written by: Damon Lindelof; Tom Perrotta
- Cinematography by: Michael Grady
- Editing by: David Eisenberg
- Production code: 4X6060
- Original air date: December 6, 2015
- Running time: 73 minutes

Guest appearances
- Bill Camp as Mystery man; Jasmin Savoy Brown as Evangeline "Evie" Murphy

Episode chronology
| ← Previous "Ten Thirteen" | Next → "The Book of Kevin" |

"I Live Here Now" is the tenth episode and season finale of the second season of the American supernatural drama television series The Leftovers, based on the novel of the same name by Tom Perrotta. It is the twentieth overall episode of the series and was written by series creators Damon Lindelof and Tom Perrotta, and directed by executive producer Mimi Leder. It was first broadcast on HBO in the United States on December 6, 2015.

In the episode, the truth of the girls' disappearance is known, as well as the motives of the Guilty Remnant.

According to Nielsen Media Research, the episode was seen by an estimated 0.991 million household viewers and gained a 0.5 ratings share among adults aged 18–49, making it the most watched episode of the season. The episode received critical acclaim, with critics praising the performances (particularly Justin Theroux), directing, writing, score, emotional tone and sense of closure.

== Plot ==
=== Flashback ===
As Kevin (Justin Theroux) and his family leave the Murphys' birthday party for John (Kevin Carroll), Evie (Jasmin Savoy Brown) and her girlfriends leave for the lake. As they drive away, they begin their vow of silence. At the lake, the girls turn the music loud and lock the car with their phones inside. They then notice Kevin with a cinder block tied to his ankle, who also notices them. He silently jumps into the lake to commit suicide, while the girls leave the scene. Shortly after they leave, the earthquake starts.

=== Present day ===
Michael (Jovan Adepo) finds a resurrected Kevin in the woods, telling him he was dead for eight hours. Their conversation of the afterlife causes Kevin to remember that he saw Evie on the night of the earthquake, and the two go to meet with John at the house. John has been notified that the palm print on the girls' car matched Kevin's, so John confronts him. While taking care of Mary (Janel Moloney) and Lily, Nora (Carrie Coon) protects them both when an earthquake strikes. Suddenly, Mary speaks, shocking Nora. The two go to see Matt (Christopher Eccleston) in the camp outside Miracle. Matt is ecstatic to see Mary, who is told that she is pregnant, both surprising and making her happy. Mary also confirms that she did indeed "wake up" on their first night in Miracle and that she and Matt had made love.

At the refugee camp, Meg (Liv Tyler) and Tom (Chris Zylka) are preparing for their plan. Meg rams a car with a towed trailer through the baracades and stops in the middle of the bridge. She states that the trailer contains explosives. As authorities retain Meg, Evie and her friends step out of the trailer, revealing that they are now members of the Guilty Remnant. John takes Kevin to the animal shelter where Kevin's dog is being quarantined, and John offers to give Kevin his dog back if he tells where Evie went. Kevin states that she faked her disappearance, which John refuses to believe. When Kevin keeps insisting, John fatally shoots him and leaves in shock as Kevin dies. John then leaves for the bridge after being informed that Evie is alive. The GR announce that the bridge to the town will be destroyed within one hour.

John goes to the church to inform Erika (Regina King) and Michael about Evie, prompting them to all go to the bridge. Erika eludes the police safety line, running to Evie and hugging her, yet Evie is unresponsive. With just over a minute left, Erika refuses to leave the bridge and inspects the trailer, finding it empty. As the countdown ends, GR members and the residents of the refugee camp all overwhelm security and walk across the bridge into Miracle. Matt and Mary join many of the people entering the town. A woman steals Lily from Nora, who gives chase. She shortly discovers Lily on the ground, in danger of being trampled. Nora shields Lily from the passing mob, until Tom saves them both and places thems safely in the trailer.

Kevin wakes up once again in the realm of the dead. He dons his Mapleton police uniform and is called to the lobby bar. There he meets the mystery man (Bill Camp) once again, who tells him that the only way he can leave the realm is by singing karaoke. Despite Kevin's reluctance he goes to the stage, where he is assigned to sing "Homeward Bound". After finishing, he wakes up again in the animal shelter, but his gunshot wound remains. He reunites with his dog and both wander through Miracle, which has fallen into chaos.

At the visitor's center, Kevin finds all members of the GR, including Meg. He then leaves and goes to Erika's clinic to treat his wound, where a shocked John finds him. A tearful John treats Kevin's wound, confused about everything that has happened. Kevin comforts him, claiming he does not understand either. As the pair returns to their homes, John wonders what he should do if his home is empty, to which Kevin responds that he can come over to his house. Before entering, another earthquake strikes the town. Once inside his house Kevin encounters Jill (Margaret Qualley), Laurie (Amy Brenneman), Matt, Mary, Tom, Lily, and Nora, who welcome him home.

== Production ==
=== Development ===
In November 2015, the episode's title was revealed as "I Live Here Now" and it was announced that series creators Damon Lindelof and Tom Perrotta had written the episode while executive producer Mimi Leder had directed it. This was Lindelof's nineteenth writing credit, Perrotta's sixth writing credit, and Leder's seventh directing credit.

=== Karaoke scene ===
Upon hearing that he would have to sing in front of an audience, Theroux immediately called Lindelof and said "fuck you". Singing, public speaking, and being under a spotlight are three of his biggest fears. The original script had Theroux sing Like a Prayer by Madonna, but the show was unable to license the song.

== Reception ==
=== Viewers ===
The episode was watched by 0.993 million viewers, earning a 0.5 in the 18-49 rating demographics on the Nielson ratings scale. This means that 0.5 percent of all households with televisions watched the episode. This was a 15% increase from the previous episode, which was watched by 0.861 million viewers with a 0.4 in the 18-49 demographics.

=== Critical reviews ===
"I Live Here Now" received critical acclaim. The review aggregator website Rotten Tomatoes reported a 100% approval rating with an average rating of 8.7/10 for the episode, based on 16 reviews. The site's consensus states: "'I Live Here Now' is a moving and satisfying finale to The Leftovers' excellent second season."

Matt Fowler of IGN gave the episode an "amazing" 9.5 out of 10 and wrote in his verdict, "'I Live Here Now' many not have been able to give everyone their due, but considering how much more there was going on here, and how many more characters there were to service, compared to the Season 1 finale, I think this one was still a triumph. Just a soul-squeezing journey from start to finish, filled with truly memorable and moving moments."

Joshua Alston of The A.V. Club gave the episode a "B–" grade and wrote, "This could very well be the end of the series, and if 'I Live Here Now' is the series finale, it's a really odd note to end on, and another deeply polarizing, spiritually playful series finale for Damon Lindelof to add to his resume."

Alan Sepinwall of HitFix wrote, "I cover television for a living, so I'm not supposed to believe in miracles. But I want to see what amazing feats The Leftovers still has in store, and I want to believe that the miracle is coming, somehow, some way." Jeff Labrecque of Entertainment Weekly wrote, "The Leftovers was the rare treat that got better in its second season. Justin Theroux and Christopher Eccleston both took my breath away with some of the most touching, most powerful performances I've seen on TV all year, and Ann Dowd's Patti deserves to be resurrected somehow — maybe she and Virgil just walked out of a cave together in Perth."

Kelly Braffet of Vulture gave the episode a 4 star rating out of 5 and wrote, "Mary's awakening was a joy and Nora shielding Lily in the stampede was terrifying. So while the Big Event was a little bit of a letdown, the people were incredibly satisfying." Nick Harley of Den of Geek gave the episode a 4 star rating out of 5 and wrote, "If that's The Leftovers' final shot, it's not the worst note to go out on. I know the ratings aren't there, but it would just feel truly criminal if The Leftovers did not get to come back for a third season. Hopefully word of mouth over this incredible season will build and people will find the series over the coming months. I rarely get emotional watching TV, but several times this season, especially with that last scene this episode, The Leftovers leaves me all choked up, deeply reflecting on what I just saw, appreciating all that I can derive from its meaning and marveled by everything I've yet to comprehend. That's what good art does."

Robert Ham of Paste gave the episode a 9.6 out of 10 wrote, "Perrotta, and Lindelof and everyone involved defied all expectations with this show's return, and there's nothing to suggest that they can't repeat their success next time around." Jen Chaney of The New York Times wrote, "The show about the Sudden Departure - about how people can get snatched away without warning - delivers a damn near perfect second season. And then, suddenly, it departs."
