= International Assassin =

- The Leftovers episode
- Kevin deliberates whether or not to push Patti into the well.
- Episode no.: Season 2 Episode 8
- Directed by: Craig Zobel
- Written by: Damon Lindelof; Nick Cuse
- Production code: 4X6058
- Original air date: November 22, 2015
- Running time: 63 minutes

Guest appearances
- Scott Glenn as Kevin Garvey Sr.; Paterson Joseph as Wayne Gilchrest; Marceline Hugot as Gladys; Steven Williams as Virgil; Bill Camp as Man on Bridge / David Burton; Gary Basaraba as Neil; Darby Camp as Young Patti Levin

Episode chronology
← Previous "A Most Powerful Adversary"	Next → "Ten Thirteen"

"International Assassin" is the eighth episode of the second season of the HBO drama television series The Leftovers, and the 18th overall. The episode's script was written by Damon Lindelof and Nick Cuse and directed by Craig Zobel. It aired in the United States on November 22, 2015.

The episode is notable for its significant stylistic departure from the rest of the series, as it follows protagonist Kevin Garvey through an ethereal, afterlife-like realm as he works to purge the ghost of deceased Guilty Remnant leader Patti Levin from his mind.

"International Assassin" received widespread acclaim from critics, who praised the episode's surreal presentation and thematic depth, as well as Justin Theroux's lead performance. Many critics favorably compared the episode's style to that of Lindelof's previous series, Lost.

== Plot ==
Having ingested Virgil's poison, Kevin suddenly awakens inside a hotel bathtub. On his wardrobe, he finds a quote from Epictetus: "Know first who you are, and then adorn yourself accordingly." He opens it to find four possible outfits: clerical robes, white Guilty Remnant attire, a suit, and his old Mapleton police uniform. Kevin wears the suit, and soon receives a knock on his door from a hotel employee delivering flowers from an unknown sender for a "Kevin Harvey." The employee suddenly attacks Kevin with a knife, but Kevin manages to kill him.

The hotel fire alarm goes off, prompting Kevin to descend to the lobby. There, he finds Virgil working as a concierge and demands to know what is going on. Virgil signals Kevin to meet him in the hotel parking garage in five minutes. Kevin spots a young girl nearly drowning in the outdoor pool and jumps into the water to save her. An older man arrives on the scene and chastises the girl without acknowledging Kevin.

Kevin then goes to the parking garage to meet Virgil, who warns him not to drink any of the water in this world. Virgil explains the details of the scenario in which Kevin finds himself: by choosing to wear the suit, Kevin assumed the role of an international assassin who has been tasked with killing Patti, who in this world is a senator running for President of the United States. Virgil informs Kevin that he has already made a generous donation to Patti's campaign that grants him a personal meet-and-greet, during which he will collect a gun from the bathroom to assassinate her. Should Kevin succeed in his mission, he will be returned to the real world, free of his visions of Patti. Virgil urges Kevin to be wary of Patti's deceptions, and says that he himself is at the hotel to "atone"; Kevin realizes Virgil is dead in the real world.

Kevin notices the TV in his room emitting harsh static, interrupted by flickering footage of what appears to be his father. Another fire alarm goes off in the building; downstairs, Kevin spots a man delivering balloons to Mary Jamison, who is shown to be able-bodied. On his way back to his room, Kevin is assaulted by Guilty Remnant members in an elevator. They bring him to Gladys, who administers a lie detector test to Kevin in advance of his meeting with Patti. Kevin returns to his room and finds his TV flickering again; this time, he is able to receive a clear signal from his father, who is communicating from a hotel room in Perth. Kevin Sr., under the influence of psychedelics, tells his son that he sent the flowers, and repeatedly instructs him to take Patti to "the well" before the signal cuts out.

GR members escort Kevin to his meeting with Patti. He attempts to retrieve the gun from the bathroom but finds it occupied by Patti's security guard: Holy Wayne. Kevin meets Patti, and the two have a pointed conversation about the GR's philosophy. Kevin excuses himself to the bathroom, collects the pistol, and swiftly kills Gladys and Wayne; Patti begs for her life, claiming to in fact be a decoy hired to impersonate the real "Senator Levin", but Kevin, remembering Virgil's warning not to succumb to Patti's manipulations, shoots her in the head. However, he finds that he still remains in this world.

Kevin returns to the lobby demanding to know from Virgil why he is still in the hotel, but Virgil does not recognize him, having drunk water since their last meeting (the water in this world is suggested to have amnesia-inducing effects). Kevin attempts to access his room but finds that his keycard no longer works. In the hallway, he meets the man he assumes to be the father of the girl from the pool, who has also been locked out of his own room. The man reveals that he is a coprophiliac, leaving Kevin to deduce that the man is actually Patti's abusive ex-husband Neil, and that the little girl with him is not his daughter but instead a young Patti. Kevin strangles Neil to death after he disparages Patti.

Kevin takes the young Patti from the hotel and drives with her to Jarden, where Virgil says the nearest well is located. In the car, Patti reads from the brochure for Jarden tourists given to them by Virgil, which says that the well was constructed by area's indigenous tribes as an axis mundi between the realms of the living and the dead. She also reveals to Kevin that she was abused by her father. While approaching the bridge into Jarden, Kevin is attacked by a man carrying a noose; after a brief struggle, the man tells Kevin he is offering him the noose to hang himself from the bridge rather than murder a child. Kevin chooses to continue onward; the man whispers an unheard message into Kevin's ear before he departs.

Kevin and Patti finally arrive at the well. Despite hesitations, Kevin eventually brings himself to push her into the well. Stepping away, he soon hears Patti's adult self calling from the bottom of the well for help. Kevin falls while descending into the well to find an injured adult Patti resting at the bottom. Patti recounts being a contestant on Jeopardy! where she successfully won enough money to leave Neil, but ultimately was too scared to do so. Kevin tearfully embraces Patti before drowning her. Patti's death triggers a violent earthquake; Kevin begins climbing out of the well, but emerges in Virgil's yard back in the real world. He is found by Michael, who is shocked to see that Kevin has returned from the dead.

== Production ==
"International Assassin" was written by Leftovers showrunner Damon Lindelof and Nick Cuse, the son of Lindelof's Lost co-creator Carlton Cuse. The idea of sending series protagonist Kevin Garvey to the underworld emerged from an observation by religious scholar Reza Aslan, who served as a consultant on the series, that Kevin was a shaman figure capable of carrying knowledge between worlds. Lindelof and the writers subsequently decided to structure an episode around Kevin's death as an interpretation of Dante's Inferno.

Lindelof and co-showrunner Tom Perrotta, who wrote the book on which the series is based, conceived of a hotel setting for the series' depiction of the afterlife, while Cuse introduced the premise of making Kevin an assassin. Cuse noted that many of the episode's plot details started as jokes in the writers' room, such as Patti being a senator with the Guilty Remnant as a political party. Series star Justin Theroux confirmed that Kevin was dead during the events of "International Assassin," per the script for the preceding episode, "A Most Powerful Adversary".

The episode makes frequent usage of "Chorus of the Hebrew Slaves" from Giuseppe Verdi's 1842 opera Nabucco as a musical cue. Lindelof took inspiration from Die Hard, whose score consists largely of Beethoven compositions, in choosing the piece as an operatic flourish for the episode. Kevin's mission to assassinate Patti closely resembles the plot of The Godfather, which is acknowledged within the episode.

"International Assassin" marks the first of multiple trips Kevin makes to the afterlife in the series, including a second visit to the hotel in the season 2 finale, "I Live Here Now." The hotel scenes were filmed at the Sheraton Hotel at the Capitol in Austin, Texas.

== Reception ==
=== Ratings ===
Upon airing, the episode was watched by 0.696 million viewers, with an 18-49 rating of 0.3.

=== Critical reception ===
"International Assassin" received widespread critical acclaim, with particular praise given to the episode's surreal setting, Lindelof and Cuse's script, and the performances of Theroux and Ann Dowd. On Rotten Tomatoes, the episode has an approval rating of 100% based on 12 reviews, with an average rating of 9.30 out of 10, with the critics' consensus stating, "The Leftovers makes a bold narrative choice in "International Assassin", an exhilarating and provocative hour of television."

Jen Chaney of The New York Times called the episode a "brain-shredding masterpiece," finding numerous parallels to 1970s films such as All the President's Men and A Clockwork Orange. Chaney cited "International Assassin" as the latest in a trend of uniquely surreal episodes of television dramas such as "Funhouse" from The Sopranos and "Far Away Places" from Mad Men, and found the episode's plot reminiscent of the episode "The Economist" from the fourth season of Lost. Matt Fowler of IGN gave the episode a full 10 out of 10 score, praising its sympathetic portrayal of Patti, remarking that the series turned her from "an obstacle to a nuisance to a malevolent force to a scared, traumatized, sympathetic woman who you truly feel for." Fowler also praised the episode's various callbacks to details from earlier in the season, such as the prehistoric opening sequence of the premiere.

Alan Sepinwall of Uproxx also compared "International Assassin" to The Sopranos, acknowledging its potential to polarize viewers with its surreal storytelling and stylistic departures from the rest of the series. Sepinwall felt the episode affirmed the series' "unflinching commitment to its themes about grief, spirituality, and madness" and praised how it handled its unexpected premise. Libby Hill of the Los Angeles Times felt the episode's strength rested on Theroux's performance, which she named one of the finest on television. Hill favorably compared the episode to The Sopranos for its "intense sense of tragedy" and drew several parallels to the Aeneid. Joshua Alston of The A.V. Club gave the episode a B, naming it the series' most polarizing entry to date and considering it "easy to admire even when it's hard to like." Alston praised the episode's bold narrative choices, attention to detail, and performances, but was less positive about the episode's place in the series' overall narrative, remarking, "the episode serves little purpose other than to presumably rid the story of Ghost Patti, whose inclusion in this season was a questionable choice to begin with."

In 2024, Rolling Stone listed it as the third best TV episode of all time.

=== Accolades ===
Damon Lindelof and Nick Cuse were nominated for the Writers Guild of America Award for Television: Episodic Drama for writing "International Assassin".
