= The Prodigal Son Returns (The Leftovers) =

- The Leftovers episode
- Episode no.: Season 1 Episode 10
- Directed by: Mimi Leder
- Written by: Damon Lindelof; Tom Perrotta
- Cinematography by: Todd McMullen
- Editing by: Henk Van Eeghen; David Eisenberg; Michael Ruscio
- Production code: 4X5710
- Original air date: September 7, 2014
- Running time: 53 minutes

Guest appearances
- Scott Glenn as Kevin Garvey, Sr.; Frank Harts as Deputy Dennis Luckey; Paterson Joseph as Holy Wayne

Episode chronology
← Previous "The Garveys at Their Best"	Next → "Axis Mundi"
- The Leftovers season 1

"The Prodigal Son Returns" is the tenth episode and season finale of the first season of the American supernatural drama television series The Leftovers, based on the novel of the same name by Tom Perrotta. The episode was written by series creators Damon Lindelof and Tom Perrotta, and directed by Mimi Leder. It was first broadcast on HBO in the United States on September 7, 2014.

The series is set three years after the "Sudden Departure" – an event which saw 2% of the world's population (approximately 140 million people) disappear and profoundly affected the townspeople. The characters of police chief Kevin Garvey and his family (wife Laurie, son Tom, daughter Jill and father Kevin Sr.) are focal points, alongside grieving widow Nora Durst, her brother Reverend Matt Jamison, and the mysterious cult-like organization the Guilty Remnant (GR), led by Patti Levin. In the episode, GR plans their next move with Patti's plan, while Kevin asks Matt for help in the cabin.

According to Nielsen Media Research, the episode was seen by an estimated 1.53 million household viewers and gained a 0.7 ratings share among adults aged 18–49. The episode received critical acclaim, with critics praising the performances (Justin Theroux), writing, themes, directing, character development and closure.

== Plot ==
While on the run, Tom (Chris Zylka) stops their car so Christine (Annie Q.) can feed her baby. Christine laments how all of Holy Wayne's promises proved to be lies and she leaves for the restroom. After a few minutes, Tom finds the baby on her own in the restroom, with Christine nowhere to be seen.

On Memorial Day, GR prepares for a new plan involving the replicas. Laurie (Amy Brenneman) does not want Jill (Margaret Qualley) to participate out of fear for the protests, but Jill comes along. During the night, GR places life-like replicas of the departed civilians on their vanishing point. Nora (Carrie Coon) wakes up to discover replicas of her husband and children, making her cry. After Patti (Ann Dowd) committed suicide, Kevin (Justin Theroux) calls Matt (Christopher Eccleston) for help. Matt is willing to help despite the fact that it could incriminate him, aware that Patti's death was on her own. After burying her, Kevin returns to Mapleton. He experiences a dream where he finds himself at a mental institution with Kevin Sr. (Scott Glenn) and Patti. Patti promises to become his "traveling companion" before forcing Kevin to wake up.

Stopping at a diner, Kevin confesses to his infidelity, noting that his relationship with his family feels lost even when they are still here and he still has hopes that they can reunite. Kevin then goes to the restroom, where he discovers Holy Wayne (Paterson Joseph), mortally wounded. Wayne accepts his death and asks Kevin to make a wish, while doubting of his own powers. Kevin silently wishes something and Wayne claims to grant it before dying from his wounds. ATFEC agents storm the diner for Wayne, and Matt vouches for Kevin, claiming that he is an innocent person. Matt and Kevin are allowed to go.

Kevin and Matt stumble upon Mapleton falling into chaos, with civilians attacking GR members and burning down their cul-de-sac. Kevin saves Laurie from being attacked by a man and carries an unconscious Jill out of a burning house. The next day, Tom arrives at Mapleton, finding Laurie. Nora writes a letter to Kevin, deciding to leave town. Kevin and Jill walk back home, taking a dog they find on the street, the same dog previously tied to the Garvey's backyard fence. Nora arrives at the Garvey house to deliver the letter, where she finds Christine's baby on the doorstep. As she cuddles the baby, Kevin and Jill arrive.

== Production ==
=== Development ===
In August 2014, the episode's title was revealed as "The Prodigal Son Returns" and it was announced that series creators Damon Lindelof and Tom Perrotta had written the episode while Mimi Leder had directed it. This was Lindelof's ninth writing credit, Perrotta's third writing credit, and Leder's third directing credit.

== Reception ==
=== Viewers ===
The episode was watched by 1.53 million viewers, earning a 0.7 in the 18-49 rating demographics on the Nielson ratings scale. This means that 0.7 percent of all households with televisions watched the episode. This was a 18% decrease from the previous episode, which was watched by 1.85 million viewers with a 0.9 in the 18-49 demographics.

=== Critical reviews ===
"The Prodigal Son Returns" received critical acclaim. The review aggregator website Rotten Tomatoes reported a 91% approval rating for the episode, based on 11 reviews. The site's consensus states: "'The Prodigal Son Returns' balances gripping horror against deeply felt drama, adding up to a white-knuckle season finale that still manages to retain The Leftovers' essential humanity."

Matt Fowler of IGN gave the episode a perfect "masterpiece" 10 out of 10 and wrote in his verdict, "'The Prodigal Son Returns' was chilling and cathartic, with many tears shed throughout. Some critics wondered why, given the global crisis at hand, we'd be following those in Mapleton. And if the show was being too microcosmal. And I think this episode's climax answered that. And given the news reports and the FBI's stance on cults, you get the feeling like boiling point moments are happening in towns, big and small, all over the world."

Sonia Saraiya of The A.V. Club gave the episode an "A–" grade and wrote, "From a purely cinematic perspective, it's a powerful, gripping conclusion. Mimi Leder directed 'The Prodigal Son Returns', and her work yields masterful stuff: Kevin running into the burning house of the Guilty Remnant to look for Jill elicited the most engagement I've had with the show all season."

Alan Sepinwall of HitFix wrote, "This has been a great year of television drama, even if at times we've had the high-class problem of too much of it. The Leftovers has been one of the absolute highlights of this year, and I imagine that this season, and the events of 'The Prodigal Son Returns', will sit with me much longer than so much of what I've been privileged to watch in 2014." Jeff Labrecque of Entertainment Weekly wrote, "In the end, the finale delivered what was promised... It's not a bad place to start season 2."

Kelly Braffet of Vulture gave the episode a perfect 5 star rating out of 5 and wrote, "All of these people that we've been watching and wondering about and caring about for all these weeks, this story that has been sometimes stagnant and sometimes an emotional gut-punch, they all crystallized this week. And, damn, was it satisfying." Nick Harley of Den of Geek gave the episode a 4 star rating out of 5 and wrote, "I'm not sure I cared much about these answers three weeks ago, but after two strong outings in a row, including a finale that didn't rely on a huge cliffhanger to pique my interest in season two, I have to say I'm generally excited to see where this show goes and if it can learn from its strengths and weaknesses. The Leftovers hasn't always been good, but it has been compelling. Kevin Garvey got his wish tonight, season two will show whether he can keep it alive."

Matt Brennan of Slant Magazine wrote, "'The Prodigal Son Returns',' like The Leftovers as a whole, is a primer for all the physical and psychic weaponry we deploy to fill the gulf that opens when what we held dear is gone." Michael M. Grynbaum of The New York Times wrote, "After nearly 10 hours of pain, the series left us with the suggestion that hope and humanity can persevere, even in the cruelest of circumstances."

=== Accolades ===
TVLine named Justin Theroux as the "Performer of the Week" for the week of September 13, 2014, for his performance in the episode. The site wrote, "By the time Kevin finally excused himself to dry his eyes, we were in tears, too. In part, because his story was so very sad. But also in part because we had just witnessed a performance that felt less like a performance than a confession."
