= Don't Be Ridiculous =

- The Leftovers episode
- Episode no.: Season 3 Episode 2
- Directed by: Keith Gordon
- Written by: Tom Perrotta; Damon Lindelof
- Production code: T13.19802
- Original air date: April 23, 2017
- Running time: 59 minutes

Guest appearances
- Lindsay Duncan as Grace Playford; Brett Butler as Sandy; Mark Linn-Baker as himself; Damien Garvey as Chief Kevin Yarborough; Joel Murray as George Brevity; Annie Q. as Christine; Turk Pipkin as Edward/Pillar Man

Episode chronology
← Previous "The Book of Kevin"	Next → "Crazy Whitefella Thinking"

"Don't Be Ridiculous" is the second episode of the third season of the HBO drama television series The Leftovers, and the 22nd overall. The episode was written by showrunners Tom Perrotta and Damon Lindelof and directed by Keith Gordon. It aired in the United States on April 23, 2017.

The episode focuses on Nora Durst as she travels to St. Louis to investigate an unusual proposal as part of her job at the Department of Sudden Departures' fraud investigation team. It also provides details on Nora's life in the three years since the end of the second season.

The episode became notable for the guest appearance of actor Mark Linn-Baker, former star of the sitcom Perfect Strangers, as a fictional version of himself who lost his co-stars to the Departure. Critics lauded "Don't Be Ridiculous" for its unexpected yet poignant inclusion of Perfect Strangers in its narrative, as well as the episode's script, emotional resonance, and Carrie Coon's central performance.

== Plot ==
Edward, the man living atop the pillar in Jarden's town square, dies of a heart attack in the middle of the night. Nora interviews his wife, Sandy - the same woman from the town's outskirts that paid Matt to beat her son with an oar - given Sandy's spurious claims that Edward departed rather than died. Nora also interviews various witnesses to Edward's apparent disappearance, one of whom mentions seeing Sandy with Matt the morning after Edward's "departure." Nora confronts Matt, who admits that he and Sandy quietly buried Edward to honor her unending devotion to her husband. Nora wants to expose Sandy's deception to the public, but Kevin advises her not to anger the townsfolk in light of the upcoming seventh anniversary of the Departure.

Nora visits the hospital to get her arm cast removed. The doctor notes that Nora was spotted inflicting the injury upon herself with her car door during her initial arrival at the hospital, but Nora evades the question. She receives a phone call from actor Mark Linn-Baker, who claims to be calling on behalf of a "third party" and offers Nora a chance to see her children again. Nora assumes the call to be fraudulent, but Linn-Baker mentions her children by name, and invites her to discuss his proposal at a hotel in St. Louis within the next 24 hours. A curious Nora receives approval from DSD colleague George Brevity to investigate the matter as a fraud case, and hastily packs for her trip.

Linn-Baker meets Nora at the hotel and explains that he represents a group of physicists investigating low-amplitude Denziger radiation (LADR), trace amounts of which were observed at various Departure sites. The scientists have since built a machine that blasts subjects with LADR, supposedly "reuniting" them with those who vanished on October 14. A skeptical Nora believes that Linn-Baker is suicidal, and that without proof of the subjects' departure, the scientists are merely incinerating them. Linn-Baker, who was the only Perfect Strangers series regular not to have departed (and was later found to have faked his own Departure), confides to Nora his torment over the improbability of his survival among his co-stars, and argues that he and the other research subjects are regaining control of their lives.

The next day, Nora takes a detour to Kentucky to check in on Lily, who has since been returned to Christine's custody and does not recognize Nora. Dismayed, Nora visits Erika, who is living contently in a new house by herself in Jarden. Nora reveals to Erika that her self-inflicted arm injury was an attempt to cover up her recently acquired tattoo of the Wu-Tang Clan's logo, which itself is covering up a tattoo bearing her children's names. The two bond by jumping on Erika's newly purchased trampoline while listening to the Wu-Tang Clan's music.

While driving into Jarden, Nora is pulled over by Tommy, who simply wants to chat, and he passively informs her he knows of her visit to Christine and Lily. Nora, destabilized by the reminder of having to give Lily away, goes to a print shop and produces a poster-size photo of Edward's exhumed corpse. She places the photo at the center of Edward's shrine in the Jarden town square, infuriating Sandy. Nora returns home and finds Kevin suffocating himself with a plastic bag; he explains he is not suicidal but merely trying to feel pain, and Nora reacts with understanding. Kevin tells Nora he wants to have a child with her, but Nora bursts out laughing in response. Linn-Baker's benefactors call Nora asking her to meet them in Melbourne with $20,000. She agrees, ostensibly to uncover the fraud without intending to enter the machine, and Kevin asks to join her.

In rural Australia, local police chief Kevin Yarborough is confronted by four women on horseback, one of whom introduces herself as Grace Playford. Grace, having read the Book of Kevin and believing Yarborough to be its eponymous police chief, asks Yarborough to join her group. When Yarborough refuses, the women kidnap and drown him, expecting Yarborough to return to life. As the women discover that Yarborough has died, Kevin Sr. emerges from Grace's house to ask what they are doing.

== Production ==
During development of the first season, writer-producer Jacqueline Hoyt proposed that the series incorporate the sitcom Perfect Strangers, of which Lindelof is a fan, into its narrative to help illustrate the real-world impact of the Sudden Departure. This led to an offhand detail in the first season mentioning that the entire cast of the sitcom had vanished, followed by a brief cameo from Perfect Strangers star Mark Linn-Baker in the season 2 premiere "Axis Mundi" where a televised news report reveals that he faked his departure. Linn-Baker had previously auditioned for the role of Nora's supervisor at the Department of Sudden Departures in the first season, but was turned down since the writers had established that the real Linn-Baker exists within the show's universe. Linn-Baker had consented to the series' usage of Perfect Strangers clips and references prior to his own appearance in the show, and instantly agreed to play a fictional version of himself when asked by Lindelof.

Linn-Baker returns for a more prominent guest appearance in "Don't Be Ridiculous", and was offered the part by Lindelof before the episode's script was written. Linn-Baker, a fan of The Leftovers, was "flattered" that he and Perfect Strangers were to play an integral role in the third season, and saw the role as an opportunity for him to play against type as a dramatic character. Lindelof and Perrotta approached Linn-Baker's appearance as a means of conveying Nora's desire to reunite with her children - the episode draws a parallel between Nora and Linn-Baker as the sole survivors of the Departure among those closest to them. Perrotta opined that the scenario lent more credibility to the idea of a machine that can replicate the Departure, stating that the fictional Linn-Baker was "vibrating on a frequency that Nora kind of gets." Lindelof elaborated: "The idea was so ludicrous, we were like, ‘Who should present it to Nora? Maybe the messenger should be as ridiculous as the idea itself?'"

The episode's opening titles make use of "Nothing's Gonna Stop Me Now," the main theme of Perfect Strangers by David Pomeranz, while utilizing the same images from the season 2 opening credits. Critics observed that the episode derives the name "Don't Be Ridiculous" from the catchphrase of Perfect Strangers protagonist Balki Bartokomous, played by Bronson Pinchot.

Regina King makes her sole appearance in the season, and final appearance in the show, as Erika Murphy. Additionally, Annie Q. reprises her role as Christine in a guest role after starring as series regular in the first season.

During the scene between Erika and Nora, the latter reveals a tattoo of the Wu-Tang Clan that she received on her arm to cover up the names of her departed children. Lindelof had tasked writers with coming up with tattoo ideas for the episode, with the winning pitch of a Wu-Tang Clan tattoo coming from writer Tamara Carter. Carter found a parallel between Nora's character development and the philosophy of the Wu-Tang Clan, stating, "To me it represents the most absurd ideology, but also the most progressive when it comes to personal freedom and, also, pain. Nora was just in so much pain, and she carries it like a samurai. You don’t see what’s underneath much. So I was like, wow, if I were her, I would probably connect with the ideology of the Wu-Tang Clan." Carter also conceived of the scene where Nora and Erika jump on the latter's backyard trampoline while listening to the Wu-Tang Clan's debut single "Protect Ya Neck".

Perrotta and Lindelof are credited in the opening titles as "Tha Lonely Donkey Kong" and "Specialist Contagious" respectively, which resulted from the two entering their names into a Wu-Tang Clan name generator.

== Reception ==
=== Ratings ===
Upon airing, the episode was watched by 0.776 million viewers with an 18-49 rating of 0.3.

=== Critical reception ===
"Don't Be Ridiculous" received widespread acclaim from critics, who particularly praised Coon's performance and expressed pleasant surprise at the role of Perfect Strangers in the episode's plot and themes. On Rotten Tomatoes, the episode has an approval rating of 100% based on 17 reviews, with an average rating of 9.00 out of 10, with the critics' consensus stating, "'Don't Be Ridiculous' cleverly utilizes 1980s sitcom humor to offer a bleak outlook on the fate of The Leftovers characters, led by a stupendous turn from a newly emboldened cast regular."

Matt Fowler of IGN rated the episode a 9.5 out of 10, calling it a "splendidly odd chapter that perfectly showcased The Leftovers' unique tone and themes." Fowler praised the episode for placing Nora "back in her fantastically damaged and feisty mode," noting how her character development was increasingly imbued with dramatic tension over the course of the episode, and singled out the "transcendent" scene between Nora and Erika on the trampoline. Joshua Alston of The A.V. Club gave the episode an A−, calling Linn-Baker's appearance "extremely effective" for examining the "real emotion behind what seemed like just an absurd post-Departure headline." Alston felt the episode's script reflected the series' multidimensional exploration of the emotional consequences of the Departure, praising Lindelof and Perrotta for "constantly displaying how much thought and consideration they’ve put into this universe." However, Alston was less enthusiastic about the epilogue set in Australia, remarking, "a story that puts two timelines on a collision course will eventually require spending time with unfamiliar characters or in new terrain, and that always feels like homework."

Alan Sepinwall, writing for Uproxx, exalted the episode for the incorporation of Perfect Strangers in its narrative, stating, "'Don’t Be Ridiculous' did that miraculous thing that The Leftovers somehow makes look routine: it turned this silly little joke about a goofy ’80s sitcom into the devastating emotional core of another incredibly powerful episode." Sepinwall praised Linn-Baker for delivering "a monologue that’s drowning in technobabble as something understandable and incredibly vital and raw," and called Coon's performance "incredible." Emily St. James of Vox also reserved praise for Coon, remarking, "what she does beautifully here is underline how Nora is spiraling, grasping at straws, trying to avoid discussing the hole at the center of her life." Caroline Framke, who co-authored the review, felt the episode underscored the series' ability to "make it plain how searching for something concrete inevitably raises more questions than anyone knows how to answer."
