= Axis Mundi (The Leftovers) =

- The Leftovers episode
- Episode no.: Season 2 Episode 1
- Directed by: Mimi Leder
- Written by: Damon Lindelof; Jacqueline Hoyt
- Cinematography by: Michael Grady
- Editing by: David Eisenberg
- Production code: 4X6051
- Original air date: October 4, 2015
- Running time: 62 minutes

Guest appearances
- Jasmin Savoy Brown as Evangeline "Evie" Murphy; Darius McCrary as Isaac Rayney; Steven Williams as Virgil; Dominic Burgess as Dr. Brian Goodheart; Mark Linn-Baker as himself

Episode chronology
← Previous "The Prodigal Son Returns"	Next → "A Matter of Geography"

"Axis Mundi" is the first episode of the second season of the American supernatural drama television series The Leftovers, based on the novel of the same name by Tom Perrotta. It is the eleventh overall episode of the series and was written by series creator Damon Lindelof and co-executive producer Jacqueline Hoyt, and directed by executive producer Mimi Leder. It was first broadcast on HBO in the United States on October 4, 2015.

According to Nielsen Media Research, the episode was seen by an estimated 0.713 million household viewers and gained a 0.3 ratings share among adults aged 18–49. The episode received critical acclaim, with critics praising the prologue, performances, atmosphere, pacing, mysteries and ending.

== Plot ==
=== Prologue ===
In prehistoric times, a tribe of cavepeople are sleeping inside a cave. A pregnant cavewoman (Sara Tomko) leaves to urinate outside when an earthquake occurs. The earthquake kills everyone in the cave by crushing them with rocks. While trying to remove some of the rocks, the cavewoman then gives birth to her baby. As they travel alone the next day, the cavewoman forages for food and the baby is almost attacked by a rattlesnake. The woman kills the rattlesnake with a rock, but is bitten in the process. The infection worsens, killing the cavewoman. Another cavewoman finds them and takes the baby, leaving the mother's body behind.

=== Present day ===
In Jarden, Texas, a teenager named Evangeline "Evie" Murphy (Jasmin Savoy Brown) goes to a lake with her friends. There, she flirts with a doctor named Brian Goodheart (Dominic Burgess). She takes a portion of the lake's water, despite the fact that it is prohibited. She returns home to her mother Erika (Regina King), father John (Kevin Carroll) and brother Michael (Jovan Adepo). The family is annoyed with the sound of a cricket, whom John cannot find inside the house. With the water that Evie retrieved from the lake, Michael goes downtown to sell them in tubes to tourists. It is revealed that Jarden is a town where more than 9,000 people live and no one vanished during the Departure, which gives it the surname "Miracle" as a national park.

John visits the local fortune teller Isaac (Darius McCrary) to ask about his future. Isaac claims that something dangerous will happen to John. Despite Isaac claiming that his predictions are real, John is not convinced. That night, while working at the fire station, John raises his concerns to his colleagues that Isaac is a fraud. John and his friends break into Isaac's house, and despite his protests, they set it on fire. Isaac is tended by the local nurse, Erika, who is aware of John's acts. Isaac states that his prediction is true and John cannot avoid it.

The next day, the family goes to church, where the pastor explains that he will step down from his services due to a surgery. His new replacement is revealed to be Matt (Christopher Eccleston), who moved to Jarden with Mary (Janel Moloney). The Murphys also find that a new family has moved next door: Kevin (Justin Theroux), Nora (Carrie Coon), Jill (Margaret Qualley) and Lily, the baby that Nora found at their previous doorstep. John decides to invite them to his birthday party that night, which they accept. At dinner, John reveals that he was in prison for attempted murder during the Departure, which disturbs Kevin, Nora and Jill. Evie suffers epilepsy, which Erika treats. She then leaves with her friends, leaving a gift for John.

An earthquake hits the town at night, awakening the Murphys. As John evacuates his family, he notices that Evie has not returned. Evie does not answer her phone and they also discover that her friends did not make it home that night. John and Michael drive to the lake, where they discover their car abandoned with the doors locked and Evie's phone inside. They are also shocked to discover that the lake has been drained, with the fishes dying.

== Production ==
=== Development ===
In September 2015, the episode's title was revealed as "Axis Mundi" and it was announced that series creator Damon Lindelof and co-executive producer Jacqueline Hoyt had written the episode while executive producer Mimi Leder had directed it. This was Lindelof's tenth writing credit, Hoyt's third writing credit, and Leder's fourth directing credit.

=== Writing ===
The idea for the opening scene emerged from a talk between Lindelof and supervising producer Reza Aslan, who wrote Zealot: The Life and Times of Jesus of Nazareth. The concept was based on the idea of where religion started, with Aslan identifying that people lived in caves and saw birds flying. While some writers were concerned about the scene, they viewed it as essential to the season's theme. He explained, "it felt right. It's that simple. We weren't trying to make any bold statement, and perhaps that's naïve. I mean, we're not idiots. We knew it was a risk. But at the end of the day, it was something we got really excited about." Lindelof hoped that by the end of the season, "the debate won't be over whether it was necessary or not, but the debate will be what it meant."

=== Music ===
Starting with this episode, the opening credits sequence is replaced. The new sequence features the song "Let the Mystery Be" by Iris DeMent. The sequence now depicts images of people having fun and spending time with other people, with some people replaced with human-shaped outlines of sky, indicating they were part of the Sudden Departure.

== Reception ==
=== Viewers ===
The episode was watched by 0.713 million viewers, earning a 0.3 in the 18-49 rating demographics on the Nielson ratings scale. This means that 0.3 percent of all households with televisions watched the episode. This was a massive 54% decrease from the previous episode, which was watched by 1.53 million viewers with a 0.7 in the 18-49 demographics.

=== Critical reviews ===
"Axis Mundi" received critical acclaim. The review aggregator website Rotten Tomatoes reported a 93% approval rating with an average rating of 9.57/10 for the episode, based on 15 reviews. The site's consensus states: "With 'Axis Mundi,' The Leftovers opens its second season by offering promises of compelling storylines, terrific acting, and a cinematic aesthetic."

Matt Fowler of IGN gave the episode an "amazing" 9 out of 10 and wrote in his verdict, "'Axis Mundi' was a riveting piece of Peak TV. When you hear about shows shaking things up and changing a lot going into extra seasons, it's natural to feel worried. Though The Leftovers is a different case really since there was no second book to base a second season on. Author and EP Tom Perrotta helped Damon Lindelof shape Season 2, though I have no idea if this is the book he'd have written if he actually committed to a sequel novel. I will say that what's happening here doesn't feel like a re-tooling, despite all the changes. Nothing feels forced due to course-correction. It feels natural to the story and, most importantly, to the world that Season 1 helped create. Either way, this is the type of premiere that only works when you have a show that's so firmly rooted in good writing and acting like The Leftovers is. With a clear sense of itself. Yes, including all the riddles and happenstance."

Joshua Alston of The A.V. Club gave the episode an "A" grade and wrote, "So yes, 'Axis Mundi' is miraculous. It's leaner and more focused than anything season one had to offer. The existential dread remains, though it's naturally less pronounced in 'Miracle' than it was in Mapleton, but the tone isn't nearly as elegiac. What's most surprising is that 'Axis Mundi' is more mysterious than anything from the first season, and far more confident. The perplexing nine-minute opening sequence is enough to put The Leftovers among the boldest, most audacious storytelling of the year."

Alan Sepinwall of HitFix wrote, "'Axis Mundi' is a wonderful, immersive dive deep into the troubled waters of this show, and I'm glad to be back in them, even though we're still just getting to know all these new players." Jeff Labrecque of Entertainment Weekly wrote, "Before sending viewers to the new home base in Texas, 'Axis Mundi' turned back the clock, Kubrick style, to the days of early man... the perfect metaphorical bridge between seasons 1 and 2."

Kelly Braffet of Vulture gave the episode a perfect 5 star rating out of 5 and wrote, "With any luck, the creators kept all of the good things from last season - the great dialogue, the fantastic acting and character development - and let the rampaging deer and inflatable penguin go free." Nick Harley of Den of Geek gave the episode a 4.5 star rating out of 5 and wrote, "Honestly, I am really surprised and impressed at how well The Leftovers pulls off this soft-reboot and sets up a season full of new dynamics and new mysteries, though I'm not holding my breath for any answers."

Robert Ham of Paste gave the episode a 9.4 out of 10 wrote, "I can safely say that within the course of one hour-long episode, Lindelof, Perrotta, and everyone involved are playing an entirely new sport here in the second year. The stakes couldn't have been higher, and, if I may mix my metaphors, they all cleared the bar with inches to spare." Jen Chaney of The New York Times wrote, "So what does it all mean? I don't know yet, and that's what makes this moment, with the rest of The Leftovers second season still ahead of us, so delicious."
