= The Leftovers (novel) =

2011 novel by Tom Perrotta

- First edition cover
- Author: Tom Perrotta
- Language: English
- Genre: Supernatural, dystopian, satire, psychological
- Publisher: St. Martin's Press
- Publication date: August 30, 2011
- Publication place: United States
- Media type: Print (hardback & paperback)
- Pages: 336
- ISBN: 978-0-312-35834-1

The Leftovers is a 2011 satirical supernatural novel by American author Tom Perrotta. Set in the aftermath of a Rapture-like event in which 2% of Earth's human population vanished into thin air, it chronicles the lives of several individuals from a small New York town attempting to adjust to the significant cultural shift brought about by the event, while also navigating their personal trauma and losses.

A television adaptation, co-created by Perrotta and Damon Lindelof, was produced for HBO, and ran for three seasons from June 29, 2014 to June 4, 2017. It garnered critical acclaim and has grown a dedicated cult following over the years.

== Plot ==
Years after a rapture-like event in which millions of people in the world vanish without explanation, the citizens of Mapleton still struggle to cope with the massive loss and resulting culture shift.

Kevin, patriarch of the Garvey family, is a prominent local businessman enjoying early retirement during the event. Afterwards, he is compelled to run for mayor of Mapleton to replace the psychologically compromised incumbent. Kevin stresses the importance of returning to normal as a way for everyone to cope, through initiatives like survivors’ mixers and adult recreation leagues. Another major policy of his tenure is easing tension between the town and the Guilty Remnant (GR) an ascetic religious group that aims to provoke people into remembering the losses of the event and how meaningless life is. Following a violent conflict between police and the GR, Kevin has taken a hands-off approach to their existence, preferring to ignore them.

Kevin’s wife leaves him to join the Guilty Remnant and he struggles to balance raising his daughter while respecting her privacy in dealing with the event and the breakdown of the Garvey family. He also finds he cannot sustain new relationships with women after a few failed attempts, until he has a new one with Nora Durst. A local celebrity of sorts in Mapleton after losing her husband and both children in the event. Nora suffers a depressive episode: obsessively watching her children’s favorite TV show, avoiding the holidays and riding her bike for hours at a time. Nora is dealt a further blow when the town pastor, who has become a muckraking amateur journalist to reconcile how the event may have invalidated his beliefs, publishes a tract that reveals Nora's disappeared husband had an affair with her children's preschool teacher, who is still around.

Kevin and Nora connect at a mixer after Nora confronts her former husband's mistress. Nora finds she has more sympathy than she expected with the teacher over a shared frustration at her husband’s emotional distance and manipulation. Nora pursues Kevin, who is hesitant, but impulsively agrees to take a trip to Florida with her. Afterwards, they settle into a relationship, but Nora is bothered that she does not feel like the ‘good girlfriend’ she was always proud of being in college. Their relationship falls apart on Valentine's Day, when Kevin breaks a convention of their arrangement by sharing personal feelings about his family, which upsets Nora. She leaves him at the restaurant when he goes to the restroom.

Kevin is served divorce papers by his wife, and realizes that his daughter is in danger of not graduating high school. He has fallen into a domestic routine with his daughter's friend, Aimee, who has been living with them, as they drink coffee together in the morning before they both go to work. Kevin, alarmed at an increasing flirtation between them, resolves to avoid being alone with Aimee. The Spring softball league begins, and even though his team is short-handed Kevin plays anyway. He finds satisfaction in the game and his ability to handle a fly ball, even in adverse conditions.

Nora decides to leave Mapleton and adopt a new identity. She bleaches her hair but finds difficult to shed her identity when time comes to sell her house. She writes a letter to Kevin, explaining why she ran from him, and admitting ambivalence towards her family the exact moment they disappeared, which had been a source of her guilt and anger. Opting to hand-deliver the letter instead of mailing it, Nora discovers an infant left on the Garvey doorstep, instantly bonding with the child just as Kevin returns from his game.

Laurie, Kevin's wife, is a new recruit of the Guilty Remnant, which she was initially skeptical of but joins after her best friend does. The GR are mute, wear all white, must always smoke in public, and stage silent confrontations with the people of Mapleton. Their aim is to remind everyone that they have been left behind after the event, and prevent any return to the status quo. After Laurie's integration into the group, she is assigned a much younger trainee, Meg. Less emotionally stable than Laurie, Meg frequently remembers the wedding she had been planning before joining the GR. The two form a friendship as they perform their GR duties, following hounding the townspeople and confronting people from their former lives. Meg in particular must confront her former fiancé, whom she is distressed to learn has begun new relationships and seems to have resumed his old life. Laurie is asked to serve Kevin divorce papers to get half the family assets – the means by which the GR can afford to maintain operations. At Christmas, Meg and Laurie visit Kevin, who treats them like regular holiday visitors. Before they leave, he gives Laurie the gift their daughter left for her: a lighter. Moved, Laurie uses the lighter once, but then must throw it away to adhere to the tenets of the GR.

Laurie and Meg are “promoted” and given an outpost, which is a four-person dwelling with many of the comforts they lacked in Guilty Remnant dorms like privacy, better food, a hot tub, soft beds, and less supervision. At first, they are worried that living with the two men who already occupy the house will cause conflict and sexual tension. The men are revealed to be in a secret romantic relationship, and their personalities mesh well. One of the men is murdered while on their GR rounds, which is a trend among members who resist all police investigation. Laurie's daughter, Jill, comes across the scene after the murder and the GR has ordered a program in which one outpost member is commanded to kill the other as a “sacrament”.

Laurie and Meg grow closer living in the outpost alone, sharing the same bed and developing a nonsexual yet romantic domestic union. The day comes when a new pair is introduced into the outpost, with the end of Laurie and Meg's time together. Laurie holds a gun to Meg’s head but cannot pull the trigger, even with Meg’s encouragement that she will be delivered by the act. Meg takes the gun and shoots herself, which Laurie sees as a final act of love. Collecting the gun Laurie is whisked away from town by a GR car.

Jill, Kevin and Laurie's daughter, is a senior in high school who was smart and hardworking but struggling in the post-event world, especially since her mother left to join the GR. Jill's new friend and classmate, Aimee, has moved into the house because she cannot live with her stepfather after her mother also disappeared in the event. Aimee dresses provocatively and often encourages Jill to skip school and experiment (smoke weed, have sex, etc.). The two attend regular parties at another teen's house, which always culminate in a risky variation of spin the bottle that pairs up the partygoers for random sexual encounters. The two girls carry on like this but find satisfaction in a happy “normal” Christmas, spent exchanging gifts with Kevin. He encourages the girls to resume their neglected schooling; Jill agrees but Aimee decides to drop out to become a waitress. With Aimee more preoccupied with her job, Jill does not find the same amount of distraction when going to the same parties. She resolves that Aimee was the catalyst that made these events work with her talent for pushing things forward. Jill is distraught to learn that Laurie did not keep the lighter Jill got her for Christmas. She attends her last party and leaves early, opting to cut across a railyard instead of taking a ride from a set of twins Aimee is friends with. There, Jill discovers the corpse of a male GR member whom she is unaware was her mother's housemate in the outpost.

That spring, Jill has a chance encounter with one of her favorite teachers who is now a part of the GR. Under the guise of helping Jill with schoolwork, she is invited to attend a “sleepover” at the GR compound. Jill anticipates the stay and possibly seeing her mother again, packing her bags. Aimee's relationship with Kevin has become blurred and risks turning sexual, so Aimee resolves to move out. Jill leaves for the GR compound without her father's knowledge, but on the way runs into the twins again, who invite her to play ping pong. She agrees and is hopeful that one of the twins seems to like her, realizing that in that moment she is happy.

Tom, the older of the two Garvey children, had been away at college during the event. He returns home after all the schools shut down in the aftermath, and drinks every night at a bar, sharing news that trickles back of who had been taken. School resumes, and Tom joins a fraternity which somewhat deifies one of their disappeared brothers. He becomes uninterested in school. One of his fraternity brothers reveals the fallacy of their fraternity's hero, and together they stumble across a New Age movement in which a man claims he can absorb the pain of others through hugs. Tom becomes wholly invested in the movement and climbs the ranks, travelling the country and cutting off almost all contact with his family. In San Francisco, the movement takes on cultish overtones that unnerve Tom. He remains faithful to Holy Wayne, the group's leader, but is marginalized after questioning some new aspects of the group.

It is discovered that Holy Wayne has “spiritually married” various underage Asian girls, and is being brought up on criminal charges. These “brides” are sent into hiding, and Tom is tasked with transporting one of them, Christine, across the country to Boston. They must travel in secret because Christine is pregnant, which is concrete evidence of the charges against Wayne. In turn, Christine and the group believe she is carrying the son of God.

Tom and Christine disguise themselves as members of a free love movement, the Barefoot People, and travel by foot and bus across country. They become close friends and easily fall into their cover story of a romantically linked couple. On a bus trip, they accidentally convert a soldier to the Barefoot movement despite not being members. Arriving in Boston is a disappointment to Tom, who now has to share Christine with a Holy Wayne couple that has been charged with overseeing the delivery of their Messiah. Tom enjoys spending time with the more contemplative Barefoot community and maintains his cover. Shortly before Christine gives birth to a girl, Holy Wayne admits guilt and repents for his crimes. The Holy Wayne movement is shattered, and Christine is despondent.

Christine wants to return home to Ohio because she does not know what else to do, and Tom takes her. He plans on stopping by Mapleton to see his family again, hoping it will encourage Christine who has little interest in her daughter. At a rest stop, Tom forces Christine to interact with her child, but when he leaves them to use the restroom she abandons Tom and her daughter to join a group of Barefoot People. Tom takes the baby with him to Mapleton and is surprised to see the town has not changed in his absence. He leaves the baby on his father’s doorstep, knowing she will be well-looked after, and leaves to pursue Christine and a life as a Barefoot Person.

== Television adaptation ==
HBO acquired rights for a TV series with Perrotta attached as writer/executive producer and Ron Yerxa and Albert Berger as executive producers in August 2011, shortly before the book came out. Damon Lindelof is also the co-creator of the project with Perrotta and was the showrunner and a writer on the series.

The series followed Justin Theroux as Kevin Garvey, a father of two and the chief of police, picking up three years after two percent of the world's population abruptly disappears without explanation. The first season loosely followed the stories in the book. The series finale aired June 4, 2017.
