= The Moth Diaries (film) =

2011 gothic horror film by Mary Harron

- Canadian theatrical release poster
- Directed by: Mary Harron
- Screenplay by: Mary Harron
- Based on: The Moth Diaries by Rachel Klein
- Produced by: Karine Martin; David Collins
- Starring: Lily Cole; Sarah Gadon; Sarah Bolger; Judy Parfitt; Scott Speedman
- Cinematography: Declan Quinn
- Edited by: Andrew Marcus
- Music by: Lesley Barber
- Production companies: Samson Films; Mediamax; Strada Films; Lionsgate UK; Telefilm Canada; Astral's Harold Greenberg Fund; Windmill Lane Pictures; Irish Film Board
- Distributed by: Alliance Films (Canada); Lionsgate (Ireland and United Kingdom)
- Release dates: 6 September 2011 (Venice); 6 April 2012 (Canada); 24 May 2013 (Ireland)
- Running time: 82 minutes
- Countries: Canada; Ireland
- Language: English
- Box office: $413,035

The Moth Diaries is a 2011 gothic psychological horror film written and directed by Mary Harron, and starring Lily Cole, Sarah Gadon, Sarah Bolger, Judy Parfitt, and Scott Speedman. Based on the 2002 American novel of the same name by Rachel Klein, it follows Rebecca, a teenage girl who suspects that Ernessa, the new student at an all-girls boarding school is a vampire.

An international co-production between Canada and Ireland, the film was co-produced by Samson Films and Mediamax, with Edward R. Pressman serving as an executive producer.

The Moth Diaries premiered at the 68th Venice International Film Festival on 6 September 2011, and was theatrically released in Canada on 6 April 2012 by Alliance Films and in Ireland on 24 May 2013 by Lionsgate. The film received generally negative reviews from critics.

== Plot ==
At the Brangwyn School, an exclusive boarding school for girls, 16-year-old Rebecca Cantor writes her most intimate thoughts in a diary. Two years earlier, Rebecca's father, a poet, took his own life by slitting his wrists. Her mother transferred Rebecca to the school, hoping to help her daughter escape the memory of her father's death. With the help of her best friend and roommate, Lucy Blake, Rebecca soon recovers.

The following year, a mysterious dark-haired girl named Ernessa Bloch comes to Brangwyn. Lucy quickly becomes best friends with Ernessa and grows distant from Rebecca, who feels uneasy about Ernessa's presence. She tries to confront Lucy about her involvement with Ernessa, but Lucy dismisses her concerns as jealousy. The girls' hallmate Charley is expelled for throwing a chair through a window after taking drugs provided by Ernessa at a party. Another friend, Dora, falls from the roof outside Ernessa's room after she and Rebecca peek inside one night and see it empty except for a cloud of moths, and a teacher who was harsh on Ernessa is found murdered in the woods. Tension starts to grow at the school. Rebecca is suspicious of Ernessa, who she sees walk through a closed window and linger near the doors of a basement where the students are forbidden to go. She sees troubling similarities between Ernessa and Carmilla when reading the story for class.

Rebecca's close friends all die, depart the school, or abandon her due to Ernessa's influence, leaving her with nowhere to turn for support but Mr. Davies, a new English teacher who is a fan of her father's poetry and shows a particular interest in her. The two share ideas on Romantic literature and poetry, and he tells Rebecca that vampires do not necessarily drink blood, but seek to drain the life from their victims. After confiding him one day, she and Mr. Davies kiss, but Rebecca pulls away. She hears a noise in Lucy's room one night and looks in to find her naked in bed with Ernessa, crying out in either pleasure or pain.

Lucy is hospitalized after refusing food for weeks and weakening, and only Rebecca thinks Ernessa is to blame. Lucy refuses to listen to Rebecca's suspicions and cruelly pushes her away, saying that she is not "the old Lucy" anymore, and that Rebecca's refusal to see this is what has ruined their friendship. Although Lucy recovers briefly, Rebecca wakes one night to find her gone, and goes outside to see Lucy rising into the air with Ernessa before they both turn into a swarm of moths and disappear. Soon after, Lucy dies.

Ernessa confronts Rebecca in the library and presents her with a razor blade, elaborating on the pleasure of death and taunting her about her father's suicide. Rebecca insists her memories of her father are happy, but Ernessa sings a disturbing nursery rhyme, "The Juniper Tree", before slitting her own wrists, causing blood to rain down on her and Rebecca. When Rebecca opens her eyes, the blood and Ernessa have vanished.

Rebecca steals the keys to the basement, where she finds an old trunk with Ernessa's name written on it, containing soil and a diary with entries dated 1907, in which Ernessa writes of coming to Brangwyn, then a hotel, after her own father's suicide. Unable to cope with the grief, she took her own life by cutting her wrists in the bath. Rebecca realizes that Ernessa is trying to compel her to kill herself, and that she was Ernessa's target all along.

Rebecca pours kerosene over the trunk, the diary, and Ernessa, who is now sleeping inside it, then sets them all on fire. Ernessa rises up screaming, but collapses back into the flames. Rebecca walks outside as fire trucks arrive, and sees the ghost of Ernessa, who turns and walks out of the building and into the sun before vanishing. Though she knows the authorities are suspicious of her, Rebecca is confident that Ernessa will not have left any remains. Now free of Ernessa's influence, she takes the razor blade out of her diary and drops it out of the window.

== Cast ==
- Sarah Bolger as Rebecca Cantor
- Lily Cole as Ernessa Bloch
- Sarah Gadon as Lucy Blake
- Judy Parfitt as Mrs. Rood
- Melissa Farman as Dora
- Laurence Hamelin as Sofia
- Gia Sandhu as Kiki
- Valerie Tian as Charley
- Scott Speedman as Mr. Davies

== Production ==
=== Development ===
Director Mary Harron originally intended for the film to be a period piece set in the 1970s, the same decade the source novel is set in. However, after Harron was unable to license the rights to several songs of the era, she instead chose to set the film in contemporary times. "I was persuaded out of it, party because it’s more expensive, but also because then it’d be another period film," said Harron. "In a way what really appealed to me had nothing to do with period, and I’d done three period films before. It doesn’t really matter what era the world of the school is. It’s kind of timeless."

Harron was drawn to the project after reading the novel, due to its platonic female romance, which she felt is "never represented. Teenage girls’ emotions is always seen in terms of boys [sic], or perhaps a rivalry with another girl. I wanted the primary emotional focus of love and devotion to be on another girl. But it's not just a lesbian film, because that's also misleading. Not that that isn't part of many adolescents, but it doesn't have to be. The unspoken, uncovered world is those romantic relationships. That was my primary interest. The supernatural element is more a vehicle for telling that story."

The Moth Diaries was an international co-production between Canada and Ireland, with Edward R. Pressman serving as an executive producer.

=== Casting ===
Harron began casting the film in March 2009. Lily Cole and Scott Speedman's casting were officially announced in September 2010, along with that of Sarah Bolger and Sarah Gadon.

=== Filming ===
Principal photography took place in Montreal beginning on 31 August 2010. Filming was scheduled to complete on 9 October 2010.

== Release ==
The film was shown Out of Competition at the 68th Venice International Film Festival. It was released in Canada by Alliance Films on 6 April 2012.

IFC Films distributed the film theatrically in the United States, screening it at the IFC Center beginning 20 April 2012.

=== Home media ===
IFC Films released The Moth Diaries on Blu-ray in North America on 28 August 2012.

== Reception ==
=== Box office ===
The Moth Diaries earned $409,197 and $3,838, for a worldwide box office gross of $413,035.

=== Critical response ===
The Moth Diaries received primarily negative reviews from critics. On the review aggregator website Rotten Tomatoes, 13% of 47 critics' reviews are positive, with an average rating of 4.2/10. The website's consensus reads: "Left in the dust of yesterday's vampiric novelties, The Moth Diaries swarms in the wind, amidst lackluster thrills and a script with too many holes to count." Metacritic, which uses a weighted average, assigned the film a score of 38 out of 100, based on 100 critics, indicating "generally unfavorable" reviews.

Neil Young of The Hollywood Reporter criticised the films lack of narrative suspense and overall inert storytelling, stating that "The Moth Diaries is about as scary and menacing as the harmless lepidoptera in the film's title." Lisa Schwarzbaum of Entertainment Weekly awarded the film an average C rating, writing that it "defeats Harron's talent for exploring darkness on the edge of kinkiness." The Toronto Star's Linda Barnard similarly found the film's storytelling inconsistent, adding: "While there’s plenty of promise, there’s no payoff with this would-be horror. A usually brave filmmaker, Harron seems to be holding back with The Moth Dairies, with the exception of one impactful fantasy scene where it literally rains blood."

Jeanette Catsoulis of The New York Times wrote favorably of the film, noting that it "dances on the border between hallucination and reality without fully committing to either. Yet the film’s narrative frailties are offset by impeccable performances and a consistently eerie tone, helped along by a location as forbidding as the Overlook." Writing for Movieline, Stephanie Zacharek noted that the film felt restrained, but praised it for its visuals and atmosphere and awarded it a seven out of ten rating. Richard Corliss of Time similarly lauded the atmosphere, noting that Harron "gets the superficial ambiance right: the school is dusty, with motes and moths fuzzing up the screen, and every night seems to have a full moon. But she sucks the psychic juice out of this tale, leaving only the pulp. She includes just enough glimpses of exposed flesh and violent death to earn the film an R rating, not enough to weave an entrancing spell."

On 4 May 2015, Scout Tafoya of RogerEbert.com included the film in his video series "The Unloved", where he highlights films which received mixed to negative reviews yet he believes to have artistic value. He stated that "unlike other young-adult adaptations, the ritual and hardship of being in high school is never edged out by the supernatural goings-on; Rebecca and her friends worry about boys and grades as much as vampires ... Harron was attempting to communicate honestly with teens and pre-teen girls, to make a movie with characters and situations they might recognize." Tafoya further added, "Where the world refuses to stop turning just because crisis mounts for one girl, and thanks to a careless if not downright malicious marketing and distribution strategy, its audience never got a chance to watch it alongside Twilight sequels or Marvel movies ... The film industry is only just learning it can't get away with ignoring women of all ages."
