= Rachel Klein =

Rachel Klein may refer to:

- Rachel Klein (chef), American chef
- Rachel Klein (novelist), American novelist, translator and essayist
