= Kevin Carroll (actor) =

American actor (born 1969)

- Born: September 6, 1969 (age 56); Salisbury, North Carolina, U.S.
- Education: New York University (MFA)
- Occupation: Actor
- Website: https://www.aboutkevincarroll.com/

Kevin Carroll (born September 6, 1969) is an American actor, best known for his roles as Calvin in the 2002 crime drama film Paid in Full, John Murphy in the HBO television series The Leftovers, and Sheriff Bechir Clemmons in the Apple TV series Widow's Bay. He also played a role as Alton Williams in the FX series Snowfall, and appeared as the character Virgil in seasons 10 and 11 of the AMC series The Walking Dead.

== Career ==
Until his main cast role in the HBO series The Leftovers, from 2015 and 2017, Carroll had appeared in minor guest roles on single episodes of numerous television series, television movies, and feature films. After The Leftovers, he has appeared in other main cast and recurring roles on television, including Snowfall, Sacred Lies, Self Made: The Madame CJ Walker Story,The Walking Dead and Let the Right One In. Since 2026, he has starred in the horror-comedy series Widow's Bay, on Apple TV (streaming service), as Sheriff Bechir Clemmons.

== Filmography ==
=== Film ===
Year	Title	Role	Notes
1994	Notes in a Minor Key	Alabama Red	Short film
1996	Ed's Next Move	Ray	
1997	Jane Street	Ty	
1998	The Object of My Affection	Louis Crowley	
1999	Being John Malkovich	Cab Driver	
1999	Jesus' Son	Chris	
2001	The Navigators	Company Rep	
2001	Monsters	Simon	
2002	Pipe Dream	RJ Martling	
2002	Paper Soldiers	Larry	
2002	Paid in Full	Calvin	
2002	The Secret Lives of Dentists	Dr. Danny	
2005	The Notorious Bettie Page	Jerry Tibbs	
2010	Good Intentions	Avery	Short film
2011	Margaret	Mr. Lewis	
2012	Saudade	Charles	Short film
2012	Lefty Loosey Righty Tighty	Gary	
2012	You're Nobody 'til Somebody Kills You	Maurice Murray	
2017	Kings	Manager	
2018	Blindspotting	James	
2018	Bloodline	Overstreet	
2019	Velvet Buzzsaw	Detective	
2022	Till	Rayfield Mooty	
2024	Road House	Stephen	

=== TV ===
Year	Title	Role	Notes
1995	New York Undercover	Paster Julian	Episode: "The Smoking Section"
1995	New York News	Ted the Teller	Episode: "The Using Game"
1996	ER	Clerk	Episode: "Ask Me No Questions, I'll Tell You No Lies"
1998	Always Outnumbered	Pegus	TV movie
2000	Third Watch	Wesley	Episode: "Officer Involved"
2001	Law & Order: Criminal Intent	Greg Generae	Episode: "The Pardoner's Tale"
2001	The Warden	Vernon	TV movie
2002	100 Centre Street	Winston Brewer	Episode: "Fathers"
2005	Strong Medicine	-	Episode: "Implants, Transplants and Cuban Aunts"
2005	Law & Order: Special Victims Unit	James McGovern	Episode: "Parts"
2008	Law & Order	Ray Manning	Episode: "Driven"
2011	Detroit 1-8-7	Reuben Davis	Episode: "Motor City Blues"
2013	Law & Order: Special Victims Unit	Cory Carter	Episode: "American Tragedy"
2015	Grey's Anatomy	Greg James	Episode: "Where Do We Go From Here?"
2015	Survivor's Remorse	Harlan	Episode: "A Time to Punch"
2015	Love Is a Four-Letter Word	Kevin	TV movie
2015–17	The Leftovers	John Murphy	Main cast (season 2–3)
2017	The Catch	Deputy Chief Nick Turner	Recurring role (season 2)
2017	The Last Tycoon	Gus	Episode: "A Brady-American Christmas"
2017	Wisdom of the Crowd	Lucas King	Episode: "Live Stream"
2017	Lucifer	Sinnerman	2 episodes
2017–22	Snowfall	Alton Williams	Recurring role (seasons 1–3), main cast (seasons 4-5)
2018	Sacred Lies	Dr. Alan Wilson	Main cast (season 1)
2019–21	The Walking Dead	Virgil	5 episodes (seasons 10–11)
2020	God Friended Me	Daryl Watkins	Episode: "The Atheist Papers"
2020	Self Made	Freeman Ransom	Main cast, miniseries
2022	Let the Right One In	Zeke Dawes	Main cast
2026	Widow's Bay	Sheriff Bechir Clemmons	Main cast
