= Mary Harron =

Canadian film director (born 1953)

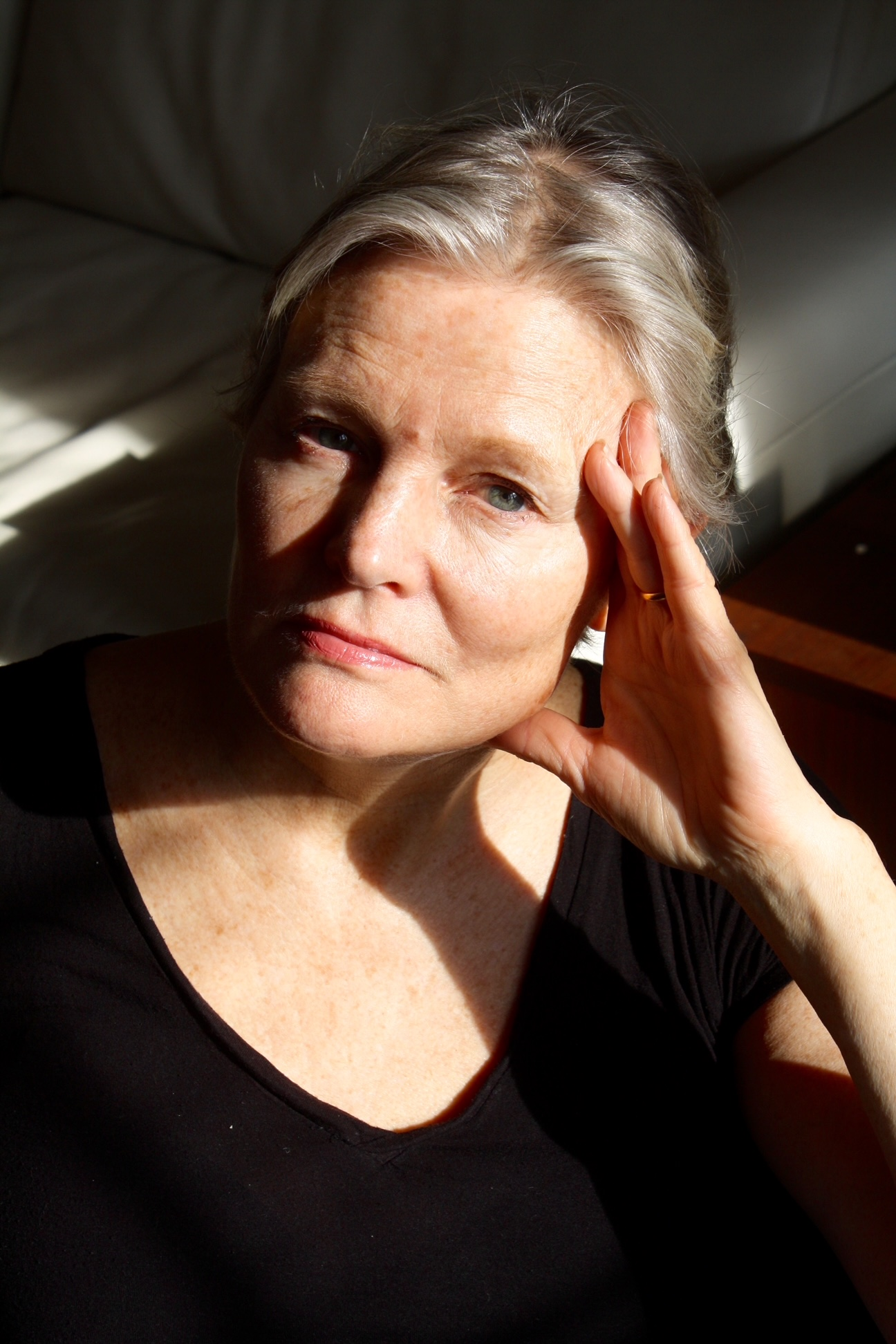
- Harron in 2019
- Born: January 12, 1953 (age 73); Bracebridge, Ontario, Canada
- Occupations: Film director, screenwriter, producer, critic
- Years active: 1987–present
- Spouse: John C. Walsh
- Children: 2
- Parent: Don Harron

Mary Harron (born January 12, 1953) is a Canadian film director and screenwriter. She is best known for directing and co-writing American Psycho, The Notorious Bettie Page and I Shot Andy Warhol.

== Early life ==
Born in Bracebridge, Ontario, Canada, Harron grew up with a family with numerous connections to the arts. She is the daughter of Gloria Fisher and Don Harron, a Canadian actor, comedian, author and director. Her parents divorced when she was six years old. Harron spent her early life residing between Toronto and Los Angeles. Harron's first stepmother, Virginia Leith, was discovered by Stanley Kubrick and acted in his first film Fear and Desire and was also featured in the 1962 cult classic The Brain That Wouldn't Die. Leith's brief acting career partly inspired Harron's interest in making The Notorious Bettie Page. Harron's stepfather is the novelist Stephen Vizinczey. Harron's second stepmother is the Canadian singer Catherine McKinnon.

Harron moved to England when she was thirteen and later attended St Anne's College, Oxford University, where she received a Bachelors in English. While in England, she dated Tony Blair, later the prime minister of the United Kingdom and Chris Huhne, another Oxford student who later became a prominent politician. She then moved to New York City and was part of its 1970s punk scene.

== Influences ==
During her adolescence, Harron was exposed to many different forms of art and film. In a 2020 interview with The New School, Harron states: "My parents took us to whatever films they wanted to see so I saw a lot of art films that would not be considered suitable for a child." She goes on to explain that her largest influences, especially as a child around the age of ten, were Alfred Hitchcock, Ingmar Bergman, and Satyajit Ray. After she had moved to London in her teen years she began attending the National Film Theatre where she was exposed to other international filmmakers like Fritz Lang, Howard Hawks, Claude Chabrol, and Roman Polanski. She was also exposed to noir films, namely Double Indemnity.

As an adult she was inspired by the films Blue Velvet, Drugstore Cowboy and The Piano, directed by Jane Campion. While she said that she had plenty of exposure to Hollywood films, she was enticed by these types of films because they were, in her words, the "forerunners of independent film."

== Career ==
=== Early writing work ===
In New York, Harron helped start and write for Punk magazine as a music journalist; she was the first journalist to interview the Sex Pistols for an American publication. She grew up in the early punk scene of America. She found the culture easy for her to fit into and was constantly evolving and spreading into new demographics. During the 1980s, she was a drama critic for The Observer in London for a time, as well as working as a music critic for The Guardian and the New Statesman. In the late 1980s, Harron participated and began her film career writing and directing BBC Documentaries.

During the 1990s, Harron moved back to New York where she worked as a producer for PBS's Edge, a program dedicated to exploring American pop culture. It was at this time that Harron became interested in the life of Valerie Solanas, the woman who attempted to kill Andy Warhol. Harron suggested making a documentary about Solanas to her producers, who in turn encouraged her to develop the project into what would be her first feature film. Harron says she owes her success with her first film to Andy who helped to sell the controversial focus on the attempted murderess, Solanas.

=== I Shot Andy Warhol ===
Harron's feature film directorial debut, I Shot Andy Warhol, released in 1996, is the partially imagined story of Valerie Solanas' failed assassination attempt on Andy Warhol. She explains her interest in Solanas' life:

For Solanas, there was this fierce, outsider quality to her unhappiness and frustration. That was a time in my life when I was frustrated myself in my work. I wanted to direct. I had the idea years before I got to direct myself. So I think there were elements of my own frustration and elements of what it was like growing up with an unfair attitude towards women ... and Valerie was an extreme example of that. There was also the intellectual interest of how someone can be so brilliant and her life goes so wrong, and also, that she was so forgotten and misunderstood. In both cases, I felt like Valerie had been consigned to history as this lunatic, almost nothing written about her.

In an interview Harron did for CBC’s Newsworld’s On the Arts in 1996, she told film critic Christopher Heard that "It was Valerie that really impelled [her] to make this film, because of the mystery of her story. [...] Not knowing who she was ... the lack of information about her." Solanas's existence was "a real piece of lost history" and an "unknown story" that she sought to explore deeper.

As far as Harron's amusement with Warhol went, she stated "As I was growing up, Warhol was the most famous artist in the world, apart from Picasso [...] My mother [disapproved] of him, so that made him even more interesting." Also regarding her interest in Warhol’s story, she felt that he, before and after the shooting, were two vastly different people. This is her reason for viewing Warhol’s shooting as a “turning point” in his life.”

The film opened the “Un Certain Regard” section of the Cannes Film Festival and received an Independent Spirit Award nomination for best first feature film. It also won the sole acting award at that year's Sundance Film Festival for Lili Taylor's performance as Solanas.

=== American Psycho ===
Harron's second film, American Psycho, released in 2000, is based on the book of the same title by Bret Easton Ellis, which is notorious for its graphic descriptions of torture and murder. The protagonist, Patrick Bateman (Christian Bale), is an investment banker who goes on a killing spree. The New York Times' Stephen Holden wrote of the film:

From the opening credits, in which drops of blood are confused with red berry sauce drizzled on an exquisitely arranged plate of nouvelle cuisine, the movie establishes its insidious balance of humor and aestheticized gore.

The film was mired in controversy before production began, due in large part to the legacy of the book's release. Harron has a liking for darker and more controversial topics, such as Valerie Solanas, but it was the satirical nature of the book that "inspired her film about perfunctory violence and obsessive consumption." As Harron began production, the crew had to contend with threats of protest, as the issue of violence in the media became crystallized by the Columbine shootings. Campaigns against the film continued throughout production, the Feminist Majority Foundation condemning the film as misogynist, and the Canadians Concerned About Violence in Entertainment (C-CAVE) convincing restaurant owners to deny Harron permission to film in their establishments. When returning to work with co-writer Guinevere Turner, Harron felt they were best suited for the job of American Psycho as they needed no hesitation on feminist values, especially after Turner's successful lesbian film Go Fish.

Although some criticized American Psycho for its violence against women, Harron and Turner made conscious decisions that project the female influence on this adaption. Harron's adaptation of this film changes the focus from purely Bateman's perspective to showcase the faces of the women as "the perspective in those murder scenes wasn't through Patrick Bateman but the women."

=== The Notorious Bettie Page ===
The Notorious Bettie Page, released in 2005, starred Gretchen Mol as Bettie Page, the 1950s pinup model who became a sexual icon. The film shows Page as the daughter of religious and conservative parents, as well as the fetish symbol who became a target of a Senate investigation of pornography. About the film, Harron said in 2006:

Clearly Bettie is a very inspiring figure to young women because she had a strong independent streak. She did what she wanted to do and she wasn't just doing it for men ... But I think it's a huge mistake to think of her as a conscious feminist heroine. As far as I can see, she didn't have an agenda, ever. She just followed her own path unconsciously. I don't think she thought of herself as a rebel in any way. She was kind of in her own world of dress-up.

Harron later stated that the film suffered from false expectations, in that many male critics and male viewers expected and wanted the film to be "sexy", but that the film instead portrayed "what it's like to be Bettie", and Page herself did not get a "sexual charge" out of her modelling.

=== The Moth Diaries ===
The Moth Diaries (2011), Harron's fourth feature film, is another adaptation of an American novel, being based on Rachel Klein's 2002 novel of the same name. The film follows a group of girls living together at Brangwyn, a boarding school. A new student arrives, Ernessa (Lily Cole) and the girls begin to suspect that she is a vampire. Harron has described the film as a "gothic coming-of-age story" that explores the nuanced friendships of teenage girls as they are repeatedly confronted with the prospect of adulthood.

=== Charlie Says ===
Harron directed the 2018 independent film Charlie Says, with a screenplay by Turner, which tells the real-life story of how three of Charles Manson's female followers (Susan Atkins, Patricia Krenwinkel, and Leslie Van Houten) came to terms with the magnitude of their crimes while incarcerated in the 1970s. Matt Smith played Manson in flashbacks. The film had initially been intended for another director, but when that director was no longer available Harron took over. Harron stated that she was fascinated by the psychological aspects of how the women ended up committing murder as a result of both manipulation by Manson and feelings of solidarity with one another.

=== Dalíland ===
Dalíland is a 2022 film directed by Harron, from a screenplay by her husband John Walsh. The film, set in the 1970s, follows the marriage between painter Salvador Dalí and his wife Gala Dalí, played by Ben Kingsley and Barbara Sukowa. The film was shot in Liverpool and released at the 2022 Toronto International Film Festival.

=== Other work ===
In addition to her films, Harron was also the executive producer of The Weather Underground, a documentary looking at the Weathermen (political activists and extremists of the 1970s). She has also worked in television, directing episodes of Oz, Six Feet Under, Homicide: Life on the Street, The L Word and Big Love. Working on the episode of Six Feet Under "The Rainbow of Her Reasons", Harron was brought back together with I Shot Andy Warhol actress, Lili Taylor.

== Views ==
Harron has been at times labelled a feminist filmmaker, in part due to her film on lesbian feminist Valerie Solanas, I Shot Andy Warhol, as well as a lesbian storyline within her 2011 teenage Gothic horror film The Moth Diaries (2011). She has consistently denied this label, although she considers herself a feminist. In a 2006 interview, and then again during an interview in 2012, she stated:

I feel that without feminism, I wouldn't be doing this. So I feel very grateful. Without it, God knows what my life would be. I don't make feminist films in the sense that I don't make anything ideological. But I do find that women get my films better. Women and gay men. Maybe because they're less threatened by it, or they see what I'm trying to say better.

She is a member of Film Fatales, a women's independent filmmaker collective.

Asked about her Canadian identity in a 2014 interview, Harron stated that she mostly felt "just not American". She stated that, to her, being Canadian meant "You don't think you're at the center of things." She also felt that, unlike American directors, she was not "a moralistic filmmaker. I'm not trying to tell people what to do, and I'm not trying to lead... I'm interested in ambiguity."

Although her films deal with controversial materials, like American Psycho, in the opinion of director Buffy Childerhose, she does not put emphasis on gore and violence.

== Personal life ==
Harron lives in New York with her husband, filmmaker John C. Walsh. They have two daughters.

== Filmography ==
=== Film ===
Year	Title	Director	Writer	Notes
1996	I Shot Andy Warhol	Yes	Yes	
2000	American Psycho	Yes	Yes	
2005	The Notorious Bettie Page	Yes	Yes	
2011	The Moth Diaries	Yes	Yes	
2018	Charlie Says	Yes	No	
2022	Dalíland	Yes	No	

Executive producer

- The Weather Underground (2002) (Documentary)
- The Notorious Bettie Page (2005)

Researcher

- BBC documentary on Andy Warhol

=== Television ===
Year	Title	Notes
1989	The Late Show	Batman special episode
1991	Without Walls	Episode "The Thing Is... Hotels"
1994	Winds of Change	Documentary movie
1998	Homicide: Life on the Street	Episode "Sins of the Father"
1998	Oz	Episode "Animal Farm"
2002	Pasadena	Episode "The Bones" Unaired
2004	The L Word	Episode "Liberally"
2005	Six Feet Under	Episode "The Rainbow of Her Reasons"
2006	Big Love	Episode "Roberta's Funeral"
2006	Six Degrees	Episode "Masquerade"
2007	The Nine	Episode "You're Being Watched"
2008	Fear Itself	Episode "Community"
2013	The Anna Nicole Story	TV movie
2015	Constantine	Episode "Quid Pro Quo"
2015	The Following	Episode "Reunion"
2017	Alias Grace	Miniseries
2020	The Expecting	11 episodes

== Awards and nominations ==
Year	Award	Category	Title	Shared With	Results	Ref.
1996	Cannes Film Festival	Un Certain Regard	I Shot Andy Warhol			
1996	Sundance Film Festival	Grand Jury Prize	I Shot Andy Warhol		Nominated	
1997	Film Independent Spirit Awards	Independent Spirit Award Best First Feature	I Shot Andy Warhol	Tom Kalin (producer) and Christine Vachon (producer)	Nominated	
2000	Las Vegas Film Critics Society Awards	Sierra Award Best Screenplay, Adapted	American Psycho	Guinevere Turner	Nominated	
2000	Sitges – Catalonian International Film Festival	Best Film	American Psycho		Nominated	
2000	Awards Circuit Community Awards	Best Adapted Screenplay	American Psycho	Guinevere Turner	Nominated	
2001	Chlotrudis Society for Independent Film Awards	Best Adapted Screenplay	American Psycho	Guinevere Turner	Won	
2001	London Critics Circle Film Awards	Director of the Year	American Psycho		Nominated	
2005	Provincetown International Film Festival	Filmmaker on the Edge Award			Won	
2006	Berlin International Film Festival	Best Feature Film	The Notorious Bettie Page		Nominated	
2011	Abu Dhabi Film Festival	Best Narrative Feature	The Moth Diaries		Nominated	
2018	Academy of Canadian Cinema and Television	Best Limited Series	Alias Grace	Noreen Halpern, Sarah Polley, D.J. Carson	Won	
2018	Academy of Canadian Cinema and Television	Best Direction, Drama Program or Limited Series	Alias Grace		Won	
2018	Gotham Independent Film Award	Breakthrough Series – Longform	Alias Grace	Noreen Halpern, and Sarah Polley	Nominated	
2018	Stockholm Film Festival	Lifetime Achievement	Lifetime Achievement Award		Won	
2018	Venice Film Festival	Best Film	Charlie Says		Nominated	
2024	Maine International Film Festival	Lifetime Achievement	Midlife Achievement Award		Won	

== See also ==
- List of female film and television directors
- List of LGBT-related films directed by women

== Bibliography ==
- Bussmann, Kate. "Cutting Edge."The Guardian. March 5, 2009. p. 16. Print.
- Heller, Dana (2008). "Shooting Solanas: Radical Feminist History and the Technology of Failure". In Hesford, Victoria; Diedrich, Lisa (eds.). Feminist Time Against Nation Time: Gender, Politics, and the Nation-State in an Age of Permanent War. Lanham, MD: Lexington Books. ISBN 978-0-7391-1123-9.
- Harron, Mary. "The Risky Territory of 'American Psycho.'" The New York Times April 9, 2000, late ed.: section 2. Print.
- Harron, Mary; "The Notorious Bettie Page" MovieNet.
- Hernandez, Eugene (January 18, 2000) "PARK CITY 2000 BUZZ: "American Psycho" NC-17; Next Wave Nabs Sundance Doc". indieWire. Retrieved November 29, 2011.
- Hurd, Mary. Women Directors and Their Films. Westport: Praeger Publishers, 2007. Print.
- King, Randall. "The Notorious Mary Harron." Winnipeg Free Press. March 1, 2012. Print.
- Marcus, Lydia. "The Pent Up and the Pinup." Lesbian News. April 2006: p. 43. Print.
- Murray, Rebecca. "Interview with Mary Harron, the Writer/Director of The Notorious Bettie Page: Harron Continues to Tackle Edgy Subject Matter in Her Latest Film". About.com. Retrieved November 29, 2011.
