= John C. Walsh =

American writer and director

John C. Walsh is an American independent film director and screenwriter who initially gained recognition with the debut of his film Ed's Next Move at the 1996 Sundance Film Festival. He has also directed the film Pipe Dream (2002) and most recently wrote the screenplay for Dalíland (2022).

== Film career ==
John C. Walsh was born and raised in Irvington, New York, and studied film as an undergraduate at New York University.

In 1996, Walsh premiered his first feature, Ed's Next Move, to critical praise at the Sundance Film Festival. A comedy about a Midwesterner adapting to life in New York, it was quickly picked up by Orion Classics for theatrical release. The film garnered critical praise as a well-formed, low-budget romantic comedy. It was noted for its witty dialogue and fresh approach to romance by Los Angeles Times' Kenneth Turan, film critic Roger Ebert and Sight & Sound magazine. The New York Times highlighted the film as an example of the indie film movement in New York City, and architect James Sanders highlighted the film in his book Celluloid Skyline, which detailed the relationship between film and New York City.

Walsh's second feature, Pipe Dream (2002), is a romantic comedy starring Mary-Louise Parker about a plumber who poses as a film director to meet women. Dubbed "a screwball satire" by Entertainment Weekly, Pipe Dream follows a romance between the plumber and a would-be screenwriter as it skewers its characters' misguided scheming. According to the New York Times, the film grounded Walsh in the genre of neo-screwball comedies that tap into the "secret charm" of New York City.

In 2011, Walsh directed Don't Ask Don't Tell for Michael Eisner's Vuguru, a minimalist adaptation of writer/actor Marc Wolf's Obie award-winning one-man play that examines the US military's gay ban through verbatim, edited interviews with straight and gay service members and their families.

In 2022, Walsh wrote the screenplay for the film Dalíland, about the late years of Salvador Dalí, directed by Walsh's wife Mary Harron. The film stars Sir Ben Kingsley as Dalí and Barbara Sukowa as his wife and muse, Gala Dalí.

== Personal life ==
Walsh is married to filmmaker Mary Harron, with whom he has collaborated on a number of original and adapted screenplays, TV pilots, and short documentaries. He also serves as an adjunct assistant professor in the graduate film division of Columbia University.

== Filmography ==
| Year | Title | Director | Writer |
|---|---|---|---|
| 1996 | Ed's Next Move | Yes | Yes |
| 2002 | Pipe Dream | Yes | Yes |
| 2011 | Don't Ask Don't Tell | Yes | No |
| 2022 | Dalíland | No | Yes |

== Awards ==
1985: "CINE Eagle Award" for Adventure Enough.

1986: "The Golden CINEMAN trophy" (First Prize) for Adventure Enough at Melbourne International Amateur Film Festival.

1987: "Grand Prize of the Festival" for Adventure Enough at Mons International Film Festival.

1996: "Best Comedy" for Ed's Next Move at St. Louis International Film Festival.

1996: "Audience Award" for Ed's Next Move at Cinequest Film & Creativity Festival.

2015: "Audience Award for Documentary Feature" runner-up for Don't Ask Don't Tell at Galway Film Fleadh.
