= Sacred Lies =

Streaming drama series

- Genre: Drama; Mystery; Anthology
- Created by: Raelle Tucker
- Based on: The Sacred Lies of Minnow Bly by Stephanie Oakes (Season 1)
- Starring: Elena Kampouris; Kevin Carroll; Kiana Madeira; Toby Huss; Ryan Robbins; Juliette Lewis; Ryan Kwanten; Jordan Alexander; Kristin Bauer; Kimiko Glenn; Emily Alyn Lind; Siobhan Williams; Odiseas Georgiadis; Adrian Holmes; David Paetkau; Michael Kopsa
- Composers: Sonya Belousova; Giona Ostinelli
- Country of origin: United States
- Original language: English
- No. of seasons: 2
- No. of episodes: 20

Production
- Executive producers: Jason Blum; Jeremy Gold; Marci Wiseman; Scott Winant; Raelle Tucker
- Producers: Alan McElroy; Chris Dickie; Jim O'Grady
- Cinematography: Cynthia Pusheck
- Editors: Kevin D. Ross; Mark Hartzell; Cecily Rhett
- Camera setup: Single-camera
- Running time: 28–34 minutes
- Production companies: Angry Annie Productions; Blumhouse Television

Original release
- Network: Facebook Watch
- Release: July 27, 2018 – April 9, 2020

Sacred Lies is an American drama streaming television series based on the novel The Sacred Lies of Minnow Bly by Stephanie Oakes that premiered on July 27, 2018 on Facebook Watch. The series was created by Raelle Tucker and stars Elena Kampouris, Kevin Carroll, Kiana Madeira, Toby Huss, and Ryan Robbins. Its second season premiered on February 20, 2020 under the title Sacred Lies: The Singing Bones. On June 15, 2020, the first two seasons were acquired by Peacock.

== Premise ==
Sacred Lies (Season 1) follows "a handless teen who escapes from a cult and finds herself in juvenile detention, suspected of knowing who killed her cult leader."

== Cast and characters ==
=== Main ===
- Elena Kampouris as Minnow Bly, a young teenage girl and former member of the Kevinian cult. She emerges from the woods of Lolo National Forest after 12 years, now missing both of her hands. She is sent to the Missoula Youth Correctional Facility after attacking a schizophrenic teenage boy. Zoë Noelle Baker portrays a young Minnow Bly in a recurring role.
- Kevin Carroll as Dr. Alan Wilson, an FBI forensic psychologist that studies religious crimes, cults, and extremist groups. He has struggled from alcoholism and became estranged from his wife Carol following the death of their son Marcus. As he gets to know Minnow and her story, he attempts to separate his personal feelings of concern for her from his professional obligations as a member of the FBI.
- Kiana Madeira as Angel Trujillo, an inmate at the Missoula Youth Correctional Facility and Minnow's roommate. She was incarcerated at the age of 12 and sentenced to serve 20 years. She was convicted of murdering her uncle with a shotgun after he sexually abused her.
- Toby Huss as Kevin Groth a.k.a. The Prophet, the leader of the Kevinian cult, known to its followers as The Community, who is killed under mysterious circumstances. He claims to speak directly with God whom he knows by the name of "Charlie". He hails from Hamilton, Montana where, when he was 2 years old, his father died. Six months later, he was diagnosed with idiopathic pulmonary fibrosis though later claimed to be cured as proof of his power & faith in “Charlie”. Eric Vincent portrays a young Kevin Groth in a guest appearance in the episode "Chapter Four: God's Eyes".
- Ryan Robbins as Samuel Bly, a construction worker and Minnow's father. Dissatisfied with his family's living situation and struggling with a gambling addiction, he eagerly joins the Kevinian cult. He is chosen as the Keeper of The Community upon their arrival in the woods wherein his responsibility is the safety and security of his fellow cult members. Following the death of his wife Olivia, he enters into a relationship with fellow Kevinian Vivienne
- Patti Kim as Sheriff Yolanda Harjo, the sheriff of Missoula investigating the fire at the Kevinian cult's community and the death of Kevin Groth. She suspects Minnow's involvement and spends a great deal of effort attempting to obtain information from her.
- Jennifer Tong as Tracey, a member of the Christian youth group at the correctional facility that constantly attempts to get Minnow to join. She was sentenced to serve time at the facility after attempting to use a Vespa to run over the girlfriend of a boy whom she loved. She subsequently began to date the boy who visits her at the facility.
- Leah Gibson as Vivienne Schroeder, a former exotic dancer and member of the Kevinian cult. She and Samuel Bly begin a relationship following the death of his wife. She proves very loyal to The Prophet and is fairly abusive to Minnow and her sister.
- Chanelle Peloso as Rose Matthews, a teenage girl from Pleasant Landing Trailer Park interested in comic books and resistant to becoming a member of the Kevinian cult. Her mother Dawn forces her into joining and she is later violently punished for breaking one of the community's rules. She is later revealed to have become one of The Prophet's many wives.
- C. J. Jackman-Zigante as Benny, a counselor at the Missoula Youth Correctional Facility. While maintaining a gruff exterior, Benny frequently offers gestures of kindness to inmates including Minnow and Angel.
- Zamani Wilder as Rashida, a member of the Christian youth group at the correctional facility. She was sentenced to the facility after being apprehended with a $1,200 alligator bag that her girlfriend had stolen and deciding to take the blame for its theft.
- Hannah Jane Zirke as Constance Bly, Minnow's younger sister and a devout member of the Kevinian cult who wishes to marry The Prophet. She resents Minnow as she becomes the object of The Prophet's affections. She is killed while rushing in to The Prophet's hut after realizing that he was already dead.
- Daniel Diemer as Cole, a member of the Kevinian cult who has a crush on Minnow. Angry at Minnow for spurning his advances, he informs the community of her relationship with Jude Leland after he saw them together.
- Katrina Law as Stephanie Bailey, the English teacher at Missoula Youth Correctional Facility. She was raised in the foster care system and also coaches the correctional facility's basketball team. She and Dr. Wilson engage in a brief affair before she ends things after discovering he has been lying to Minnow.
- Kathryn Kirkpatrick as Mrs. New, the Director of Facilities at Missoula Youth Correctional Facility where her job is to oversee the order and security of the center and monitor the health and well-being of all of the inmates.
- Georgia Beaty as Krystal, an inmate at the correctional facility that harasses Minnow and is subsequently injured by Angel who was attempting to defend her. She later reveals that she is mentally ill and that she frequently acts out when her medications begin to wane.
- Curtis Caravaggio as Trevor Pollankowsky, a military veteran and member of the Kevinian cult.
- Sean Owen Roberts as Heath, a member of the Kevinian cult.
- Shane Paul McGhie as Jude Leland, a teenage boy that lives in a cabin out in the woods of Lolo National Forest. He came to live there after his environmental activist father Wade Leland became a fugitive from the law due to suspected arson. He begins a relationship with Minnow, helps her burn down the Kevinians' community, and attempts to get her to return to the woods with him.
- Anja Savcic as Olivia Bly, Minnow's mother and Samuel's wife who is hesitant to join the Kevinian cult. She is pregnant with her second child and concerned about giving birth outside of a hospital. She dies following the birth of her daughter Constance after suffering from blood loss.
- Shelby Armstrong as Hairnet Girl, an inmate at the correctional facility that serves food in the mess hall. She later provides a makeshift birthday cake for Minnow's going away party.
- Yael Yurman as Aviva, a Jewish inmate at the correctional facility and one of Minnow's friends.
- Maya Kooner as Chandra, a Muslim inmate at the correctional facility and one of Minnow's friends.
- Reese Alexander as Owen, the manager of Pleasant Landing Trailer Park and its only black resident. He doesn't join the Kevinian cult with the rest of his neighbors as he finds it clear that they do not want him due to his race.
- April Telek as Dawn Matthews, a nurse and member of the Kevinian cult who forces her daughter Rose into joining as well. Being a nurse, she helps to deliver Olivia Bly's daughter Constance. She ends up feeling a great deal of guilt over Olivia's death during childbirth.
- Myles McCarthy as Philip Lancaster, a young schizophrenic man off his medication that is attacked by Minnow and left with various injuries. He later attends Minnow's parole hearing where he offers her a gesture of forgiveness.
- Olivia Steele Falconer as Nikki, an inmate at the correctional facility that bullies Minnow though who later seems to have become her friend.
- Karen Holness as Carol Wilson, a lawyer and Dr. Wilson's now ex-wife. The couple became estranged following the suicide of their son Marcus. After finalizing their divorce, he lets her know that he will be alright and indicates that he is beginning to move on.

=== Guest ===
- Wesley Salter as Scott Nussbaum ("Chapter One: The Handless Maiden"), a member of the extremist group Army of Mercy who is interviewed by Dr Wilson. He killed a doctor, and the man's wife, who had performed abortions
- Ari Solomon as Charlie Dunlap ("Chapter Four: God's Eyes"), a janitor at Kevin Groth's high school for over 30 years that was fired after reports of inappropriate behavior with students. He reportedly died of cancer not long after his dismissal
- Christina Jastrzembska as Mrs. Groth ("Chapter Four: God's Eyes"), Kevin Groth's widowed mother who holds her son in high esteem and believes that he was destined for a divine purpose.
- Duncan Ollerenshaw as Carl Groth ("Chapter Four: God's Eyes"), Kevin Groth's brother who harbors feelings of resentment towards him due to the fact that he was left to care for their mother alone.
- Isaach de Bankolé as Dr. Carter Elgin ("Chapter Eight: Wedding Day"), the owner of Elgin Advanced Robotics Laboratory who is developing new robotic prosthetics for amputees. He entered into his field after losing a leg in the Rwandan genocide. Dr. Wilson visits him to inquire about obtaining a pair of robotic hands for Minnow.
- Eric Bempong as Marcus Wilson ("Chapter Ten: Subject - Minnow Bly"), Dr. Wilson's late son who committed suicide by driving his car off a bridge. Dr. Wilson continues to feel great remorse over his death and holds himself responsible for not doing more to prevent it.

=== Main ===
- Juliette Lewis as Harper
- Ryan Kwanten as Peter/Hunter
- Jordan Alexander as Elsie/Maya
- Kristin Bauer as Shannon
- Kimiko Glenn as Lily
- Emily Alyn Lind
- Siobhan Williams
- Odiseas Georgiadis
- Adrian Holmes
- David Paetkau
- Michael Kopsa

== Episodes ==
=== Series overview ===
Season	Subtitle	Episodes	Originally released	
Season	Subtitle	Episodes	First released	Last released
1	—	10	July 27, 2018	September 14, 2018
2	The Singing Bones	10	February 20, 2020	April 9, 2020

=== Season 1 (2018) ===
No. overall	No. in season	Title	Directed by	Written by	Original release date
1	1	"Chapter One: The Handless Maiden"	Scott Winant	Raelle Tucker	July 27, 2018
A 17-year old girl, Minnow Bly, is picked up under a bridge in Missoula, Montana by police after attacking a young man, Philip Lancaster, and nearly beating him to death. She is taken to the local sheriff's office and processed. After being moved to the hospital, Minnow is introduced to Dr. Alan Wilson, a forensic psychologist for the FBI investigating the cult she was allegedly a member of and the death of their leader. Minnow is charged with aggravated assault and given a disposition order for five years of incarceration with the possibility of parole on her 18th birthday. She is sent to the Missoula Youth Correctional Facility where she is expected to spend the first year of her detention. While there she is roomed with Angel, a juvenile delinquent who advises her not to trust anyone and keep to herself. Minnow meets with Dr. Wilson again where she makes a deal with him to divulge information about her former cult in exchange for a letter of recommendation towards her possible parole. Afterwards, Dr. Wilson goes to the site of the cult in Lolo National Forest. While investigating the area, he is knocked unconscious by a mystery assailant.
2	2	"Chapter Two: Love Bomb"	Scott Winant	Jenny Klein	July 27, 2018
Mrs. New invites Minnow into her office where she presents her with a pair of prosthetic hands. Meanwhile, Dr. Wilson awakes in his car, still at Lolo National Forest, after Sheriff Harjo begins knocking on his door. Later, Minnow sits down with him and begins to tell him about the Kevinian cult. He visits what's left of Pleasant Valley trailer park and speaks with the only remaining resident. While out in the yard, Minnow throws her prosthetic hands in the trash, realizing they were only meant to make others comfortable around her. After gaining her confidence, he convinces Minnow to reveal who cut off her hands: her father. In flashbacks, a young Minnow is standing by a tree near her family's trailer. She is approached by a strange man whom her father says, "speaks to God." The man, referred to as "The Prophet". He speaks to a gathering of the trailer park residents and informs them that he does in fact speak to God, known to the man as "Charlie", and that he has been sent to them. Minnow's mother and father argue over whether they should leave. After Minnow intervenes, Olivia acquiesces and the residents arrive at the forest.
3	3	"Chapter Three: The Iron Slippers"	Everardo Gout	Lauren MacKenzie & Andrew Gettens	July 27, 2018
Twelve years earlier, the Kevinian cult is beginning to establish their community when Minnow's sister is born. The Prophet declares that "Charlie" has named her Constance. During the birth, Minnow's mother Olivia suffers a great deal of blood loss. Minnow runs off into the woods where Rose reads her "Cinderella" from a copy of Grimm's Fairy Tales. Minnow returns to discover her mother has died and The Prophet convinces everyone it is due to someone else's disobedience. Minnow turns over Rose who goes through a "cleansing" where she is forced to wear slippers made of iron heated in a fire. In present day, Dr. Wilson is led to a former cult member Vivienne, who is selling goods at an outdoor market. Vivienne implies that Minnow was responsible for the cult's demise. Back at the correctional facility, Minnow is assigned an English class taught by Stephanie Bailey, where she becomes anxious over her illiteracy. Later, Bailey and Wilson discuss Minnow over drinks at a bar. Eventually, Ms. Bailey gains Minnow's confidence and begins to teach her to read. Back at the bar, Dr. Wilson runs into Sheriff Harjo who informs him that Minnow is the prime suspect in a murder investigation.
4	4	"Chapter Four: God's Eyes"	Everardo Gout	Alan McElroy	August 3, 2018
In a flashback, a teenage Minnow tells her younger sister Constance the story of how Kevin Groth first encountered "Charlie" and became The Prophet. That night, Minnow and Vivienne get into an argument after Vivienne begins to harshly chastise Constance. While serving her turn as a lookout for Charlie overnight, Minnow has a vision of her mother. In present day, Minnow and Dr. Wilson debate the veracity of The Prophet's teachings and how she believes that Charlie may still be real. Minnow and Angel have a discussion regarding religion wherein Angel explains her atheist beliefs and trust in science and logic. Minnows asks Angel to teach her science and she begrudgingly accepts. Dr. Wilson visits Kevin Groth's mother and brother who provide him with more information on his past. Minnow and Angel sneak out of their room with the help of Benny and view a meteor shower together. Dr. Wilson visits Kevin Groth's high school and learns that he may have been abused by a janitor named Charlie Dunlap leading to his subsequent behavior. He later returns to his motel room to discover that it has been ransacked and sees Samuel Bly pull his car out of the parking lot.
5	5	"Chapter Five: St. Chad's Day"	Sarah Boyd	Molly Nussbaum	August 10, 2018
As the correctional facility prepares to celebrate Valentine's Day, Minnow tells Angel about the cult's holiday, St. Chad's Day. According to Minnow, the occasion was meant to celebrate St. Chad, the killer of the last giant in America. Over at the motel, Sheriff Harjo returns Dr. Wilson's camera to him since recovered from the woods. He discovers a photograph featuring a mysterious figure that Minnow later identifies as a boy from the woods, Jude Leland. Later on, Ms. Bailey visits Dr. Wilson at the motel to deliver a card Minnow had made for him. Back at the correctional facility, Angel beats up a girl harassing Minnow. In a flashback, Minnow is presented with a frog from fellow cult member Cole who has a crush on her. While out picking berries to dye clothes with, the frog escapes from Minnow's custody. As she follows it, she stumbles across a teenage boy, Jude, playing guitar in a tree. Sometime later, Cole sees Minnow out on the edge of the cult's land, gives her a kiss, and warns her to be careful. The following day, Minnow sees Jude again and discovers he has followed her suggestion and built walls for his treehouse.
6	6	"Chapter Six: We're All Made Of Stars"	Sarah Boyd	Lindsey Villarreal	August 17, 2018
In a flashback, Minnow and Jude spend time in the treehouse singing together and dancing. Minnow gets into an argument with Jude over The Prophet's teachings and storms off. While at dinner, Minnow challenges The Prophet's teaching that black people do not have souls. She goes on to follow him and discovers that he has been lying to his followers. The following day, Minnow and Jude meet in the treehouse. He explains the circumstances of his father's illness and eventual suicide. Jude and Minnow have sex and as they lay next to each other, Cole looks on from a distance. In present day, Minnow meets with Mrs. New who tells her the circumstances of Angel's imprisonment and cautions her against trusting Dr. Wilson. Meanwhile, Dr. Wilson researches Jude Leland and discovers that his father was an ecoterrorist suspected of arson. Minnow storms out of a session after he suggests that Jude or his father might be responsible for The Community's demise. Out in the national forest, Dr. Wilson finds Jude in front of the Lelands' cabin but he runs off. Sheriff Harjo is called and she arrives at the site with officers who exhume the body of Jude's father.
7	7	"Chapter Seven: Phantom Pain"	Sheree Folkson	Jenny Klein	August 24, 2018
In a flashback, Minnow is awoken by Vivienne and brought outside where she is met by fellow Kevinians including her father and The Prophet. Minnow is accused of being with a "Rymanite" (the cult's term for a Black person) based on information from Cole. While initially denying the charge, Minnow then begins to run off into the woods though is soon caught by Trevor. Following a fight with her father, Minnow and The Prophet engage in an argument. He declares Minnow's penance to be the loss of her hands and has her father chop them off with an ax. In present day, Dr. Wilson and Minnow engage in a discussion over religion leading her to talk about it with other inmates. Later, Dr. Wilson runs into Ms. Bailey at a gas station. The pair head back to Wilson's motel room and have sex. After Bailey leaves, Wilson is knocked out, abducted, and awakens in the woods tied to a tree. Samuel then arrives with the police showing up not long after. Back at the correctional facility, Angel returns from solitary confinement. She and Minnow share a moment of catharsis by shouting expletives and inspire others to do the same.
8	8	"Chapter Eight: Wedding Day"	Sheree Folkson	Alan McElroy	August 31, 2018
In a flashback, Minnow is recovering from the loss of her hands when her sister Constance informs her that The Prophet has chosen Minnow to be his next wife. She is later escorted from her family's domicile by Rose and Vivienne to her wedding to The Prophet. Surrounded by member of the community, The Prophet begins to give a speech about Minnow's future and as he attempts to kiss her, she faints. Minnow awakens in The Prophet's hut and is aided in escaping by Rose. She runs away and heads to Jude's cabin where she passes out in his arms. In present day, Angel opens up to Minnow about her past and Minnow informs her of her deal with Dr. Wilson. Angel tells Minnow that Wilson lied and cannot help her. Sheriff Harjo then arrives to interview Minnow as Vivienne has accused her of killing The Prophet. Harjo presses her to confess and Minnow reacts violently before being taken away. Afterwards, Ms. Bailey confronts Wilson about the deception. Feeling guilty, Wilson visits a robotics laboratory and attempts to acquire a set of robotic hands for Minnow. After being released from solitary, Minnow reveals to Angel that she killed The Prophet.
9	9	"Chapter Nine: Storming the Castle"	Scott Winant	Andrew Gettens & Lauren MacKenzie	September 7, 2018
Dr. Wilson awakens in his motel room with Jude standing nearby. He informs Jude that Minnow is still alive and that he is suspected in the Kevinian arson. Moments later, Sheriff Harjo arrives and reveals that Samuel has confessed to the fire but that she does not believe him. Back at the correctional facility, Minnow and Angel prepare for basketball game when Bailey and Wilson take her aside and allow her a short reunion with Jude. While at the game, Wilson shows up and apologizes to Minnow. As he leaves, Minnow asks him if he wants to hear the end of her story. In a flashback, Minnow awakens in Jude's cabin where he is taking care of her by cleaning out her wounds. The pair begin to devise a plan to attack the community and bring Constance back with them. The following night, they enter the community armed with makeshift molotov cocktails. As Jude begins to ignite and throw the bottles, Samuel appears and the two engage in a fight. Meanwhile, Minnow awakens Constance and notices her hands have also been severed. Constance tells Minnow to leave and reveals that she is set to marry The Prophet the following morning.
10	10	"Chapter Ten: Subject - Minnow Bly"	Scott Winant	Molly Nussbaum & Raelle Tucker	September 14, 2018
In a flashback, Minnow enters The Prophet's hut and sees her severed hands. She begins to tear the hut apart when The Prophet suddenly enters. The two argue as his respiratory condition becomes agitated and he searches for his inhaler to no avail. As he slowly dies on the ground, Minnow exits the hut. Outside, she is confronted by Vivienne and Samuel. While they argue, Constance arrives, sees the burning hut, and runs inside in distress. She is killed almost instantly. In present day, Ms. Bailey and Angel help Minnow prepare for her parole hearing. In his home office, Dr. Wilson is working when his ex-wife Carol enters. Dr. Wilson finishes his report on Minnow and goes to the site where Marcus died. Concurrently, Minnow speaks before the parole board and explains her actions. Back in her room, Minnow informs Angel that she has been granted parole and is met with anger. Later, Minnow prepares to leave and is given a goodbye party. Angel arrives and makes up with Minnow. Dr. Wilson appears and reveals to Minnow that he is gifting her with robotic hands which are subsequently attached. Minnow then enters the world and begins her new life.

=== Season 2: The Singing Bones (2020) ===
No. overall	No. in season	Title	Directed by	Written by	Original release date
11	1	"Chapter One: The Singing Bones"	Scott Winant	Raelle Tucker	February 20, 2020
12	2	"Chapter Two: The Siren Song"	Scott Winant	Molly Nussbaum	February 20, 2020
13	3	"Chapter Three: Case 20-054"	Jessica Lowrey	Jennifer Goméz	February 20, 2020
14	4	"Chapter Four: Family Portrait"	Jessica Lowrey	Hilly Hicks Jr.	February 27, 2020
15	5	"Chapter Five: Prom Night"	Logan Kibens	Tony Saltzman	March 5, 2020
16	6	"Chapter Six: Monsters and Men"	Logan Kibens	Brennan Elizabeth Peters	March 12, 2020
17	7	"Chapter Seven: The Hunt"	Scott Winant	Hilly Hicks Jr.	March 19, 2020
18	8	"Chapter Eight: Dark Knights"	Scott Winant	Tony Saltzman	March 26, 2020
19	9	"Chapter Nine: Bloodline"	Cheryl Dunye	Molly Nussbaum	April 2, 2020
20	10	"Chapter Ten: With the Dancing Lions"	Cheryl Dunye	Caroline Hayes & Raelle Tucker	April 9, 2020

== Production ==
=== Background ===
Series creator Raelle Tucker has expressed how she was initially drawn into developing the series due to her own childhood experiences growing up in a cult. During the 1970s, Tucker and her family were members of the Rajneesh movement and years later these events would inspire her to want to work on a project involving the subject of cults.

=== Development ===
On January 16, 2018, it was announced that Facebook had given the production, a television series adaptation of Stephanie Oakes's novel The Sacred Lies of Minnow Bly, a series order for a first season consisting of ten episodes. The series was set to be written by Raelle Tucker who would also executive produce alongside Scott Winant, Jason Blum, Marci Wiseman, and Jeremy Gold. Tucker was also set to act as the series' showrunner while Winant would direct the first two episodes. Production companies involved in the series were slated to include Blumhouse Television, a subsidiary of independent film company Blumhouse Productions. On June 23, 2018, it was announced that the series would premiere on July 27, 2018. On December 13, 2018, it was announced that the series had been renewed for a second season which premiered on February 20, 2020 under the title Sacred Lies: The Singing Bones.

Series writer Molly Nussbaum has expressed the difficulty involved in the series' writing due to the time constraints imposed by Facebook. She explained how instead of viewing the limitation as an obstacle the staff saw it as a creative opportunity saying, "the 30-minute challenge really made us rigorous and smart."

=== Casting ===
On March 2, 2018, it was announced that Elena Kampouris, Kevin Carroll, Kiana Madeira, and Ryan Robbins had been cast in main roles. A month later, it was announced that Toby Huss had joined the main cast in a series regular role and that Katrina Law and Leah Gibson would appear in a recurring capacity.

=== Filming ===
Principal photography for season one began on March 15, 2018 in Vancouver, Canada and was set to last until May 25, 2018. Filming for the second season began on July 3, 2019 and ended on September 13, 2019.

== Release ==
=== Marketing ===
On June 23, 2018, a teaser trailer for the series was released. On July 16, 2018, the full trailer for the series was released. From July 19 to July 22, 2018, during the 2018 San Diego Comic-Con, the series was promoted through an escape room experience outside of Petco Park.

=== Premiere ===
On June 24, 2018, the series held a screening at Seriesfest, an annual international television festival, at the Sie FilmCenter in Denver, Colorado. The screening was followed by a question-and-answer session with creator/executive producer Raelle Tucker, director/executive producer Scott Winant, Blumhouse co-president of television Jeremy Gold, and cast members including Kiana Madeira, Kevin Carroll, and Elena Kampouris. It was moderated by Facebook Watch's head of development, Mina Lefevre.

== Reception ==
In a positive review, Variety's Caroline Framke offered the series praise saying, "With episodes running at an economical half-hour, Sacred Lies maintains a solid enough balance between withholding answers and laying groundwork for the mysteries ahead." In a similarly favorable critique, Paste's Alexis Gunderson lauded the series saying, "It is very artistic, not just in the color saturation, but in every shot of hands, fingers, and things that need hands and fingers to cross Minnow's line of sight in the detention center—shots that would feel fetishizing were it not for the absolute opacity of thought with which the shrewd Minnow, who is never presented as an object of pity, regards them. It is absolutely artistic. It is also grim. It is also an active, challenging watch. It is, as far as I can tell, all the things everyone's favorite dark prestige television is." In a more mixed assessment, The Globe and Mail's John Doyle offered the series restrained approval saying, "Sacred Lies is a good, multilayered drama, although the vaguely supernatural quality to Minnow's past is milked a bit too hard." In an overall negative review, Indiewire's Ben Travers gave the series a grade of "C−" and criticized it saying, "This half-hour drama is ineffective in teasing its larger mystery, and its dialogue can be laughably blunt. Die-hard fans of the book may stick around to see how it all plays out, but that would take a level of commitment usually seen...in cults!"

== Other media ==
=== Aftershow ===
The Official Sacred Lies After Show is a companion aftershow series that airs live on the series' official Facebook page on Sunday evenings. The series is produced by AfterBuzz TV, hosted by Juliet Vibert, and features a panel of commentators and a featured guest from the show's cast or crew. Each episode runs between seventeen and fifty-three minutes in length.

No.	Episode(s) discussed	Featured guest	Original release date
1	"Chapter One: The Handless Maiden"	Raelle Tucker	July 29, 2018
Commentators: Dakota T. Jones, Taylor Gates, & Evan Mack
2	"Chapter Two: Love Bomb"	N/A	August 5, 2018
Commentators: Dakota T. Jones & Taylor Gates
3	"Chapter Three: The Iron Slippers"	Elena Kampouris	August 5, 2018
Commentators: Dakota T. Jones & Taylor Gates
4	"Chapter Four: God's Eyes"	Elena Kampouris	August 5, 2018
Commentators: Dakota T. Jones, Taylor Gates, & Evan Mack
5	"Chapter Five: St. Chad's Day"	Molly Nussbaum	August 12, 2018
Commentators: Taylor Gates & Evan Mack
6	"Chapter Six: We're All Made Of Stars"	Zamani Wilder	August 19, 2018
Commentators: Taylor Gates & Evan Mack
7	"Chapter Seven: Phantom Pain"	Leah Gibson	August 26, 2018
Commentators: Dakota T. Jones, Taylor Gates, & Evan Mack
8	"Chapter Eight: Wedding Day"	Alan McElroy	September 2, 2018
Commentators: Dakota T. Jones & Taylor Gates
9	"Chapter Nine: Storming the Castle"	Lauren MacKenzie	September 9, 2018
Commentators: Taylor Gates
10	"Chapter Ten: Subject - Minnow Bly"	Molly Nussbaum	September 16, 2018
Commentators: Dakota T. Jones, Taylor Gates, & Evan Mack
11	"Season One"	Jenny Klein	September 23, 2018
Commentators: Taylor Gates

=== Fatal Following ===
Fatal Following: The Truth About the Kevinian Cult is a companion true crime pseudo-documentary series released exclusively on the series' official Facebook page. The series is done in the style of modern true crime docuseries and every episode delves into the background of a different member of the Kevinian cult. Each episode runs between two and three minutes in length.

No.	Title	Original release date
1	"The Vanishing of Olivia Bly"	July 30, 2018
2	"The Sordid Past of Samuel Bly"	August 1, 2018
3	"The Unstable Beginnings of Kevin Groth"	August 6, 2018
4	"The Story of Vivienne Schroeder"	August 8, 2018
5	"The Nurse Who Longed for Love"	August 13, 2018
6	"The Rebellious Nature of Rose Matthews"	August 15, 2018
7	"The Paranoia of Trevor Pollankowsky"	August 20, 2018

=== Juvie Stories ===
Juvie Stories is a companion series released exclusively on the series' official Facebook page. The series is done in the style of internet vlogs and features various inmates from the Missoula Youth Correctional Facility speaking directly to camera. Each episode runs between one and four minutes in length.

No.	Title	Original release date
1	"A Message from Rashida"	August 1, 2018
2	"Nikki's Fakeup Tips"	August 27, 2018
3	"A Message from Krystal"	August 29, 2018
4	"Rashida's Love Life"	September 1, 2018
5	"Tracy's Sincerest Apology"	September 3, 2018
6	"Chandra's Anger Management"	September 5, 2018
7	"Angel's Story"	September 8, 2018
