= Pipe Dream (film) =

- US DVD cover
- Directed by: John C. Walsh
- Written by: John C. Walsh; Cynthia Kaplan
- Starring: Mary-Louise Parker; Martin Donovan
- Music by: Alex Lasarenko
- Production companies: Curb Entertainment; Digital Classics
- Distributed by: Castle Hill Productions (USA)
- Release date: October 4, 2002 (Limited)
- Running time: 91 minutes
- Country: United States
- Language: English

Pipe Dream is a 2002 romantic comedy film, starring Mary-Louise Parker and Martin Donovan. The film was directed by John C. Walsh, who previously wrote and directed the film Ed's Next Move.

== Plot summary ==
In New York City, David (Donovan), a plumber who is unsuccessful with women, creates a new identity as David Coppolberg, a film director, as a way to meet women. Due to his good looks and unfamiliarity with film, which passes for inscrutability, he is considered an indie talent. Complicating the situation is the script stolen from Toni (Parker), who in turn uses his success to further her own ambitions.

== Cast ==
- Martin Donovan as David Kulovic
- Mary-Louise Parker as Toni Edelman
- Rebecca Gayheart as Marliss Funt
- Anthony Arkin as Cousin Mike
- Marla Sucharetza as Lorna Hufflitz
- Kevin Carroll as RJ Martling
- Kevin Sussman as James
- Natalie B. Pyper as Melanie Phillips
- Guinevere Turner as Diane Beltrami
- Peter Jacobson as Arnie Hufflitz
- Jill Hennessy as Marina Peck

== Reception ==
Entertainment Weekly film critic Owen Gleiberman called Pipe Dream "One of the funniest films I've seen this year...". The picture was also dubbed "neo screwball" by Karen Durbin of the New York Times. Durbin notes, "In bringing class tensions into play for his sparring lovers, Mr. Walsh...revives an aspect of classic screwball that has become almost taboo in Hollywood even as the sexual strictures that once fueled the genre have dissolved."

Pipe Dream was featured in Los Angeles Times film critic Kenneth Turan's 2004 book Never Coming To A Theater Near You. The book features a group of some less-widely seen films he felt deserved more attention. Of this film and John C. Walsh's previous film Ed's Next Move, Turan writes, "The two films share Walsh's unmistakable sensibility, a gentle and unforced way of examining the vagaries of human behaviour that is as sure-handed and insightful as it is understated."
