= Jordan Alexander =

Canadian singer and actress (born 1993)

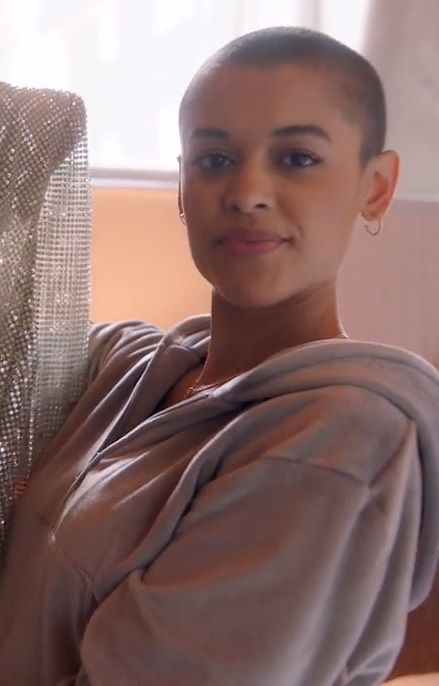
- Alexander in 2021
- Born: July 27, 1993 (age 32); Vancouver, British Columbia, Canada
- Occupations: Actress; singer
- Years active: 2011–present

Jordan Alexander (born July 27, 1993) is a Canadian actress and singer. She first gained recognition for starring in the Facebook Watch series Sacred Lies: The Singing Bones, prior to landing her breakout role as the lead character Julien Calloway in the HBO Max series reboot of Gossip Girl.

== Early life ==
Jordan Alexander was born on July 23, 1993 in Vancouver, British Columbia, and later relocated to Toronto, Ontario at the age of 12. Alexander is of German, Irish and mixed African-American descent. Alexander has two siblings, an older sister, Sydney, and a younger sister.

== Acting career ==
In 2018, Alexander signed with a modeling agency located in Toronto.

In 2020, Alexander played Elsie/Maya on the second season of the Facebook Watch series Sacred Lies: The Singing Bones.

From 2021 to 2023, she starred in the HBO Max revival of Gossip Girl as the new main protagonist Julien Calloway.

== Musical career ==
In 2016, she released her debut album, The Lonely Hearts Club.

In 2018, she performed as an opener for singer Kehlani at Toronto Pride. In 2019, she collaborated with singer-songwriter Carly Rae Jepsen for a Pride performance.

In 2020, she released the single "You".

On September 4th, 2024, she released her album Now You're Caught Up which was executive produced by JUNO-award winner Haviah Mighty. Alexander stated that she wrote, produced and recorded the album while filming Gossip Girl.

== Endorsements ==
In 2022, Alexander was announced as a brand ambassador of Savage x Fenty.

== Personal life ==
Alexander is queer. She currently resides in Brooklyn.

== Filmography ==
Year	Title	Role	Notes	Ref.
2020	Sacred Lies: The Singing Bones	Elsie/Maya	Main role (Season 2)	
2021–2023	Gossip Girl	Julien "JC" Calloway	Main role	
2025	The Institute	Kate	Recurring role	
