= Let the Right One In (TV series) =

American TV series

- Promotional release poster
- Genre: Psychological drama; Supernatural horror; Coming-of-age
- Created by: Andrew Hinderaker
- Based on: Låt den rätte komma in by John Ajvide Lindqvist
- Starring: Demián Bichir; Anika Noni Rose; Grace Gummer; Madison Taylor Baez; Ian Foreman; Nick Stahl; Jacob Buster; Kevin Carroll
- Music by: Dan Romer; Giosué Greco
- Country of origin: United States
- Original language: English
- No. of seasons: 1
- No. of episodes: 10

Production
- Executive producers: Andrew Hinderaker; Marty Adelstein; Becky Clements; Seith Mann; Alex Yves Brunner; Simon Oakes; Carl Molinder
- Producers: Demián Bichir; Jamie Crowell; Russ Hammonds
- Production location: New York City
- Production companies: Colossal Productions; Hammer Film Productions; Tomorrow Studios; Showtime Networks

Original release
- Network: Showtime
- Release: October 9 – December 11, 2022

Let the Right One In is an American horror drama television series created by Andrew Hinderaker and inspired by the 2004 Swedish novel of the same name by John Ajvide Lindqvist. The series stars Demián Bichir, Anika Noni Rose, Grace Gummer, Madison Taylor Baez, Ian Foreman, Nick Stahl, Jacob Buster and Kevin Carroll. It diverges from and expands upon the source material, focusing on a father who cares for his daughter after she becomes a vampire.

It premiered on Showtime on October 9, 2022. It received generally positive reviews from critics, who praised the actors. The series was canceled after one season. The entire 10-episode series is available on DVD

== Premise ==
Mark Kane is a single father who has been protecting his daughter Eleanor after she turned into a vampire ten years prior. She has been stuck in the age of 12 ever since. Hoping to find a cure, together they have been hiding and running across the country until finally settling in New York City.

Meanwhile, Eleanor meets and bonds with a 12-year-old boy named Isaiah Cole, as Kane brings in a scientist, Claire Logan, to help find a cure for his daughter's vampirism.

Unlike the 2008 film of the same name directed by Tomas Alfredson, this adaptation of Let the Right One In portrays Eli or "Eleanor's" companion Isaiah as an empathetic and kind hearted child despite being bullied. In the novel and film, Eli's companion Oskar's bullying clearly takes a toll on him and he "may well be a serial killer in the making." (Kern 71).

== Cast and characters ==
=== Main ===
- Demián Bichir as Mark Kane
- Anika Noni Rose as Naomi Cole
- Grace Gummer as Claire Logan
- Madison Taylor Baez as Eleanor Kane
- Ian Foreman as Isaiah Cole
- Nick Stahl as Matthew Dean
- Jacob Buster as Peter Logan
- Kevin Carroll as Zeke Dawes

=== Recurring ===
- Željko Ivanek as Arthur Logan
- Fernanda Andrade as Elizabeth Kane
- Jimmie Saito as Ben Jones
- Josh Wingate as Roland
- Caroline Neff as Danielle Wilson

=== Guest ===
- Ato Essandoh as Frank

== Episodes ==
No.	Title	Directed by	Written by	Original release date	U.S. viewers (millions)
1	"Anything for Blood"	Seith Mann	Andrew Hinderaker	October 9, 2022	0.054
2	"Intercessors"	Seith Mann	Andrew Hinderaker	October 16, 2022	N/A
3	"Broken Glass"	Seith Mann	Laura Marks	October 23, 2022	N/A
4	"Outings"	Eva Sørhaug	Mfoniso Udofia	October 30, 2022	N/A
5	"Quoquo Modo Necessarium"	Eva Sørhaug	Andrew Hinderaker	November 6, 2022	N/A
6	"Stargazers"	Viet Nguyen	Ren Dara Santiago	November 13, 2022	N/A
7	"More Than You'll Ever Know"	Sarah Boyd	Andrew Hinderaker	November 20, 2022	0.072
8	"Or Stay and Die"	Viet Nguyen	David Turkel	November 27, 2022	0.102
9	"Monster"	Hiromi Kamata	Laura Marks	December 4, 2022	0.109
10	"What's Done in The Dark"	Chloe Okuno	Andrew Hinderaker	December 11, 2022	0.066

== Production ==
=== Development ===
A television adaptation based on the 2004 novel, Let the Right One In, by John Ajvide Lindqvist was in development for A&E. On August 29, 2016, the pilot was in development at TNT as an eerie drama following the same premise as its predecessor. On April 13, 2017, TNT announced they had scrapped the pilot and were shopping the series to other networks in its current iteration or a potential redo.

On March 15, 2021, Showtime ordered a pilot for the series, with Andrew Hinderaker serving as showrunner. On September 22, 2021, the show was ordered as a 10-episode series.

In an October 2022 interview, Ajvide Lindqvist mentioned he was not involved with the show, explaining that he inadvertently sold all rights to the book for only 1 SEK when he thought he was only giving Hammer Films the rights to make Let Me In (2010), the American remake of the 2008 film adaptation of the book, meaning he will earn no royalties from the TV show; according to him, Hammer had misled him about the nature of the contract, saying "there were thick bundles of American legal prose. And that would then mean that I sold all the rights for a penny, but that was just a mere formality and would have no practical meaning, they said." On January 30, 2023, Showtime canceled the series after one season.

=== Casting ===
Kristine Froseth was cast in the TNT iteration of the pilot as the lead, Eli, on September 29, 2016. On October 13, 2016, Benjamin Wadsworth and Thomas Kretschmann were tapped to star as the other leads, Henry and Inspector Eriksson, respectively. On October 20, 2016, Necar Zadegan and Cameron Gellman joined the pilot in the series regular role FBI Special Agent Sarah Church, and the recurring role of Kyle, respectively. Darren Mann joined the pilot in a recurring role as Lukas on October 25, 2016. The pilot at TNT was eventually scrapped in April 2017 before entering production.

On March 15, 2021, Demian Bichir signed onto the pilot as the lead, now in development at Showtime. Anika Noni Rose joined the main cast as Naomi on April 15, 2021. Grace Gummer joined the main cast as Claire on April 29, 2021. Nick Stahl was cast as a series regular as Matthew on January 26, 2022. On June 17, 2021, Madison Taylor Baez was cast in the lead opposite Demián Bichir as Eleanor. Kevin Carroll, Jacob Buster and Ian Foreman were also amongst the new cast additions. Željko Ivanek & Fernanda Andrade joined the series in recastings as Elizabeth and Arthur, respectively. Larry Pine and Susan Santiago played their respective roles in the pilot. Jimmie Saito, Josh Wingate, and Caroline Neff joined the series in recurring roles as Ben, Roland, and Danielle Wilson, respectively.

=== Filming ===
Principal photography for the pilot began on May 31, 2021, in New York City. The series entered production in early 2022.

== Reception ==
=== Critical response ===
The review aggregator website Rotten Tomatoes reported a 67% approval rating with an average rating of 6.7/10, based on 30 critic reviews. The website's critics consensus reads, "Let the Right One In doesn't hold a candle to the cinematic original, but viewers who invite this vampiric chronicle into their homes and television screens will be rewarded with compelling performances." Metacritic, which uses a weighted average, assigned a score of 63 out of 100 based on 18 critics, indicating "generally favorable reviews".

=== Ratings ===
Viewership and ratings per episode of Let the Right One In
No.	Title	Air date	Rating (18–49)	Viewers (millions)
1	"Anything for Blood"	October 9, 2022	0.02	0.054
2	"Intercessors"	October 16, 2022	0.01	0.066
7	"More Than You'll Ever Know"	November 20, 2022	0.02	0.072
8	"Or Stay and Die"	November 27, 2022	0.03	0.102
9	"Monster"	December 4, 2022	0.01	0.109
