= Dalíland =

2022 American film

- Film poster
- Directed by: Mary Harron
- Written by: John C. Walsh
- Produced by: Edward R. Pressman; David O. Sacks; Chris Curling; Daniel Brunt; Sam Pressman
- Starring: Ben Kingsley; Barbara Sukowa; Christopher Briney; Rupert Graves; Alexander Beyer; Andreja Pejić; Suki Waterhouse; Ezra Miller
- Cinematography: Marcel Zyskind
- Edited by: Alex Mackie
- Music by: Edmund Butt
- Production companies: Pressman Film; David O. Sacks Productions; Zephyr Films; Popcorn Films; Serein Productions
- Distributed by: Magnolia Pictures
- Release dates: September 17, 2022 (TIFF); June 9, 2023 (United States)
- Running time: 104 minutes
- Country: United States
- Language: English
- Box office: $476,275

Dalíland is a 2022 American biographical film directed by Mary Harron. It is based on the true story of the painter Salvador Dalí and his tempestuous marriage to muse and wife Gala during the 1970s. The film stars Ben Kingsley, Barbara Sukowa, Christopher Briney, Rupert Graves, Alexander Beyer, Andreja Pejić, Suki Waterhouse, and Ezra Miller.

Dalíland had its world premiere at the Toronto International Film Festival on September 17, 2022 and was released in the United States on June 9, 2023 by Magnolia Pictures.

== Plot ==
Set in 1974 New York, Dalíland follows James, a young assistant working at a gallery. He is assigned by his boss to assist the aging surrealist painter Salvador Dalí and ensure he completes his paintings for an upcoming major exhibition. As James enters Dalí's chaotic world at the St. Regis Hotel, he finds the artist surrounded by an extravagant entourage, parties, and endless distractions. James discovers that Dalí's financial situation is a mess, largely orchestrated by his domineering wife, Gala, and his manager, Captain Moore. Gala spends Dalí's wealth on her young lover, a Broadway singer named Jeff Fenholt. To maintain their lavish lifestyle, Dalí is forced to mass-sign blank canvases, which are later sold as forgeries, leading to a major art fraud scandal. Through flashbacks (featuring a younger Dalí), the film explores the origins of Dalí and Gala's toxic but deeply co-dependent relationship. Despite the chaos, James manages to help Dalí finish the exhibition. However, the emotional toll is heavy. After the exhibition, the story shifts to Spain. Gala eventually passes away, leaving Dalí completely heartbroken, isolated, and physically deteriorating until his own death. James looks back at his brief time with the genius artist with a mix of awe and sadness.

== Cast ==
- Ben Kingsley as Salvador Dalí
  - Ezra Miller as Young Dalí
- Barbara Sukowa as Gala
  - Avital Lvova as Young Gala
- Christopher Briney as James Linton
- Rupert Graves as Captain Moore
- Alexander Beyer as Christoffe
- Andreja Pejić as Amanda Lear
- Suki Waterhouse as Ginesta/Lucy
- Mark McKenna as Alice Cooper
- Zachary Nachbar-Seckel as Jeff Fenholt
- Joella Hinson-King as Donyale Luna
- Paul Hilton as Milan Art Dealer
- Irina Leoncio as Nurse
- Alberto Maneiro as Functionary
- Matthew James Ovens as Renaldo
- Merce Ribot as Rosa
- Gavin Spokes as Gilbert Hamond
- Jack Shalloo as Desmond Carter

== Production ==
In May 2018, Ben Kingsley, Lesley Manville, Tim Roth, Frank Dillane and Ezra Miller joined the cast of the film, with Mary Harron directing from a screenplay by herself and John C. Walsh. Miller was initially cast as James by Harron, but was forced to drop out due to scheduling conflicts with Fantastic Beasts: The Secrets of Dumbledore, leading Harron to cast newcomer Christopher Briney. Miller was instead offered the role of a young Salvador Dalí (who's played by Ben Kingsley for most of the film in his later years), appearing only sparingly in some flashback sequences. In May 2021, Barbara Sukowa, Alexander Beyer, Avital Lvova, Christopher Briney, and Rupert Graves were added, while Andreja Pejić, Suki Waterhouse and Mark McKenna had replaced Manville, Roth and Dillane, and principal photography has been concluded.

The movie was largely filmed in Liverpool, which was used to double New York City.

== Release ==
Dalíland had its world premiere at the Toronto International Film Festival on September 17, 2022. In November 2022, Magnolia Pictures acquired distribution rights to the film. It received a theatrical and on-demand release on June 9, 2023.

== Reception ==
On the review aggregator website Rotten Tomatoes, 44% of 70 critics' reviews are positive, with an average rating of 5.3/10. The website's consensus reads: "Ben Kingsley adds some rich color to Dalíland's palette, but given the dynamic subject matter, this is a frustratingly bland biopic portrait." Metacritic, which uses a weighted average, assigned the film a score of 59 out of 100, based on 20 critics, indicating "mixed or average" reviews.
