= The Moth Diaries =

Novel by Rachel Klein

- Author: Rachel Klein
- Language: English
- Genre: Horror
- Publisher: Counterpoint Press
- Publication date: 2002
- Publication place: United States
- Media type: Print (hardback & paperback)
- Pages: 246
- ISBN: 0-553-38218-7
- OCLC: 57170287
- Dewey Decimal: 813/.6 22
- LC Class: PS3611.L45 M68 2003

The Moth Diaries is a horror novel by American writer Rachel Klein, published in 2002. It was her debut novel.

== Plot summary ==
At a girls' boarding school, a 16-year-old unnamed narrator, records her most intimate thoughts in a diary. The object of her growing obsession is her roommate, Lucy Blake, and Lucy's friendship with their new and disturbing classmate, Ernessa. Around her swirl dark rumors, suspicions, and secrets as well as a series of ominous disasters. As fear spreads through the school and Lucy isn't Lucy anymore, fantasy and reality mingle until what is true and what is dreamed bleed together into a waking nightmare that evokes with gothic menace the anxieties, lusts, and fears of adolescence. At the center of the diary is the question that haunts all who read it, "Is Ernessa really a vampire?" or has the narrator trapped herself in the fevered world of her own imagining?

== Film adaptation ==
The book was adapted into a movie released in 2011, one of the major changes was naming the narrator Rebecca despite her being unnamed in the novel. It was directed by Mary Harron. Lily Cole stars as Ernessa, Scott Speedman as Mr. Davies and Sarah Bolger as Rebecca. Commenting on the film, director Harron said: "This is a chillingly atmospheric horror story with real emotional depth. I’ve tried to stay true to Rachel Klein’s novel in the way it re-works and updates the Gothic tradition and the whole notion of girl-on-girl vampires."
