= Rachel Klein (chef) =

American chef

Rachel Klein is an American chef.

== Early life ==
Klein grew up in Park Slope, Brooklyn

== Career ==
Klein has trained under chefs such as Anita Lo, Peter Hoffman, and Mark Spangenthal. Klein has previously held positions as executive chef at Asana in the Mandarin Oriental hotel in Back Bay, Boston; executive chef at Red Stripe; and chef de cuisine at XO Cafe, both in Providence, Rhode Island.

Klein opened The Liquid Art House in May 2014, and in December 2018, she opened RFK Kitchen in Needham, Massachusetts.

== Recognition ==
She was named 2006 "Best New Chef of Boston" in Boston Magazine, as well as winning two of Esquire Magazine's 20 best new restaurants for OM Restaurant in Harvard Square, Cambridge, Massachusetts and Lot 401 in Providence, Rhode Island. She is also a rising star for Starchefs magazine.
