= Ed's Next Move =

- Directed by: John Walsh
- Written by: John Walsh
- Produced by: Sally Roy
- Starring: Matt Ross; Callie Thorne; Kevin Carroll
- Cinematography: Peter Nelson
- Edited by: Pamela Martin
- Production company: Bluehawk Films
- Distributed by: Orion Classics
- Release dates: January 21, 1996 (Sundance); September 27, 1996 (United States)
- Running time: 88 minutes
- Country: United States
- Language: English
- Box office: $106,791

Ed's Next Move is a 1996 American romantic comedy film written and directed by John Walsh, and starring Matt Ross, Callie Thorne and Kevin Carroll. A micro-budget film about a transplanted Midwesterner adapting to life in New York's East Village, the film appeared at the 1996 Sundance Film Festival where it received critical praise and was picked up by Orion Classics for theatrical release.

== Premise ==
After being dumped by his girlfriend, twentysomething scientist Eddie decides to uproot himself from his home state of Wisconsin and takes a job in New York City. In the Big Apple, Eddie's new roommate Ray encourages him to start dating again. Eddie has little luck with women until he meets Lee, a bohemian musician. The two appear to be opposites on the surface, but Eddie is determined to make things work with her.

== Cast ==
- Matt Ross as Eddie Brodsky
- Callie Thorne as Lee
- Kevin Carroll as Ray
- Ramsey Faragallah as Dr. Banarjee
- R.E. Rodgers as Officer Sanchez
- Jimmy Cummings as Raphael, Lee's boyfriend
- Nina Sheveleva as Elenka
- Rick Kaplan as Bond Trader Jordan
- Joseph Fuqua as Bond Trader Bryce
- Catherine Curtin as Anne
- Aunjanue Ellis as Erica
- A.J. Brentano as 'Nitty Gritty' Disputer
- Will Arnett as Weather Video Guy
- Jack Merrill as Nice Gu

== Production ==
John Walsh wrote the script in 1991, then titled More Bad Times, and shopped it around to film studios; after receiving no interest due to its lack of a big-name star, Walsh resolved the make the film himself.

The film's budget, reportedly $93,000, was primarily financed on Walsh's credit cards. The film's production was also made possible in part by the availability of leftover 35 mm film stock from Wayne Wang's film Smoke.

Principal photography began in October 1994 and took four weeks. Scenes set in Wisconsin were filmed in Morristown, New Jersey.

== Release ==
In the fall of 1995, a rough cut of the film was screened at the Independent Feature Project's Film Market. An organizer for the Sundance Film Festival happened to be present at the screening and invited Walsh to show his film as part of the 1996 festival lineup. Upon the film's Sundance premiere, the film secured distribution rights with Orion Classics and was later given a limited theatrical release beginning on September 27, 1996. It also screened at the 1996 Toronto International Film Festival.

== Reception ==
On review aggregate website Rotten Tomatoes, Ed's Next Move has an approval rating of 80% based on 10 critics' reviews.

The Los Angeles Times' Kenneth Turan called the movie "one of the most appealing, audience friendly films at Sundance," while Roger Ebert referred to the film as "a truth telling comedy with quiet wit and bright dialogue. He further added the film "is a comedy, not a docudrama, and yet it's more accurate about romance than many more serious movies. For one thing, it is driven by dialogue and social uncertainty, rather than by testosterone." Sight & Sound called it "a perfectly formed romantic comedy."
