= Rachel Klein (novelist) =

American novelist

Rachel Klein is an American novelist, translator and essayist.

She is the author of the 2002 novel The Moth Diaries. It was adapted to the screen by director Mary Harron and premiered at the 2011 Venice Film Festival. Daughter of Nobel prize winning University of Pennsylvania economics professor Lawrence Klein and originally from Philadelphia, Pennsylvania, Klein currently works and resides in Brooklyn, New York, with her family. Her stories and translations have appeared in The Paris Review, Bomb, The Chicago Review and The Literary Review.
